= 2008 World Monuments Watch =

Nonprofit advocacy program

The World Monuments Watch is a flagship advocacy program of the New York-based private non-profit organization World Monuments Fund (WMF) that calls international attention to cultural heritage around the world that is threatened by neglect, vandalism, conflict, or disaster.

== Selection process ==
Every two years, it publishes a select list known as the Watch List of 100 Most Endangered Sites that are in urgent need of preservation funding and protection. The sites are nominated by governments, conservation professionals, site caretakers, non-government organizations (NGOs), concerned individuals, and others working in the field. An independent panel of international experts then select 100 candidates from these entries to be part of the Watch List, based on the significance of the sites, the urgency of the threat, and the viability of both advocacy and conservation solutions. For the succeeding two-year period until a new Watch List is published, these 100 sites can avail grants and funds from the WMF, as well as from other foundations, private donors, and corporations by capitalizing on the publicity and attention gained from the inclusion on the Watch List. Since the Watch List was launched in 1996, more than 75 percent of the enlisted threatened sites have been saved.

== 2008 Watch List ==
The 2008 World Monuments Watch List of 100 Most Endangered Sites was announced on June 6, 2007 by WMF President Bonnie Burnham. The 2008 Watch List highlights three critical man-made threats affecting the world's cultural heritage: political conflict, unchecked urban and industrial development, and global climate change.

On this list, man is indeed the real enemy. But, just as we caused the damage in the first place, we have the power to repair it, by taking our responsibility as caretakers of the world’s cultural heritage seriously. So today we are sounding the alarm, using the World Monuments Watch List to demonstrate, through the vivid examples of beloved places around the world, the importance of working together to meet these challenges and join forces to protect our world’s shared architectural heritage.

— Bonnie Burnham, WMF president, launch of 2008 Watch List

=== List by country/territory ===
The colossal Buddha statues of Afghanistan's Bamiyan Valley were destroyed by the Taliban in 2001 after branding them as "un-Islamic". Since then, conservators have carried out emergency work to document and conserve the statues' surviving fragments in situ.

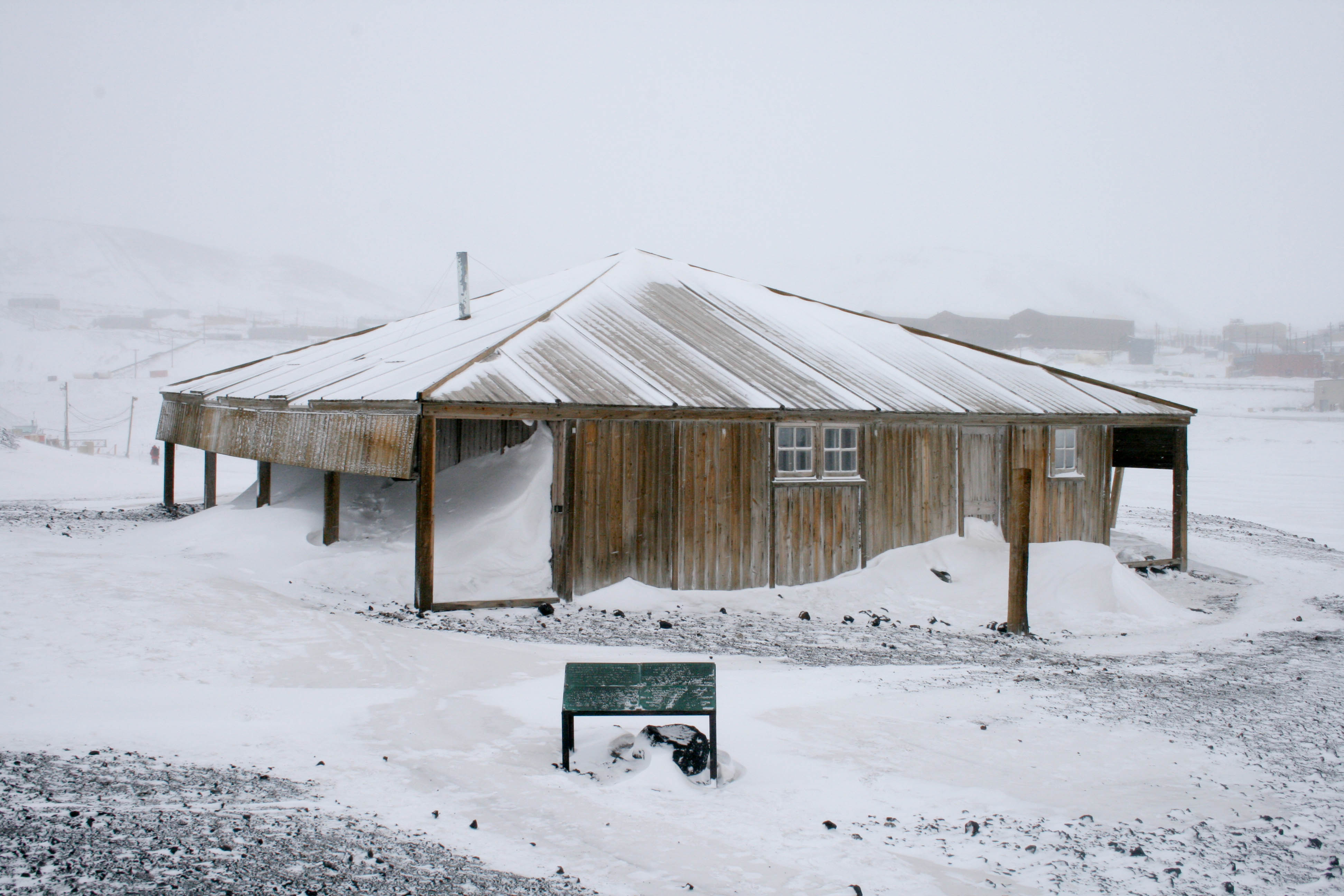
Explorer Robert Falcon Scott's hut serves as a mute testimony to the heroic age of Antarctic exploration during the early 20th century. Unprecedented buildup of snow and ice, thought to be due to climate change, imperils this monument.

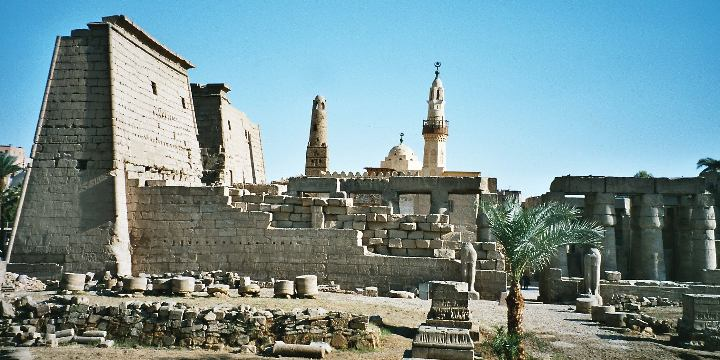
The Theban Necropolis on the Nile's West Bank is famed for its pharaonic remains, but also features sites dating back to Paleolithic times.

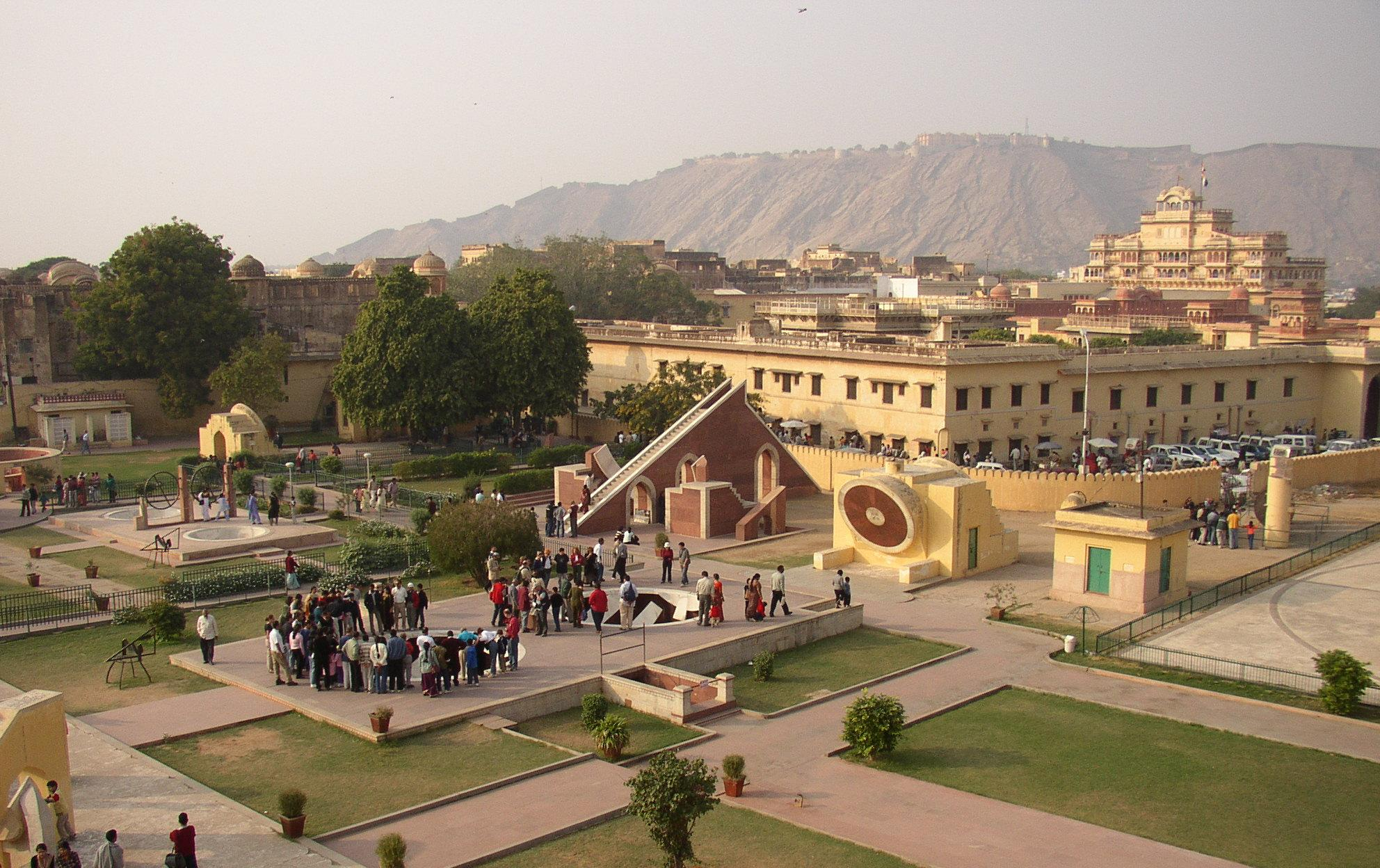
Jaipur's Jantar Mantar is one of the five sites from India to be included on the 2008 Watch List.

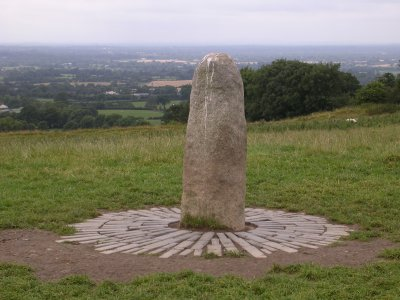
A planned motorway threatens the Iron Age site of Tara Hill in Ireland, leading to its inclusion on the 2008 Watch List.

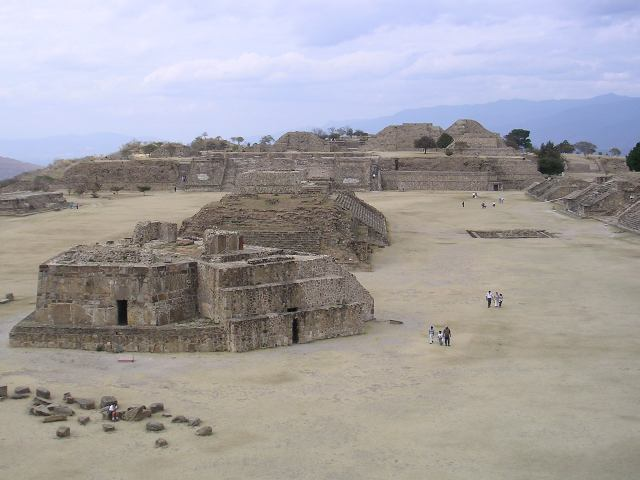
Mexico's Monte Albán archaeological site has been threatened by a lack of protection due to the civil unrest in the locality.

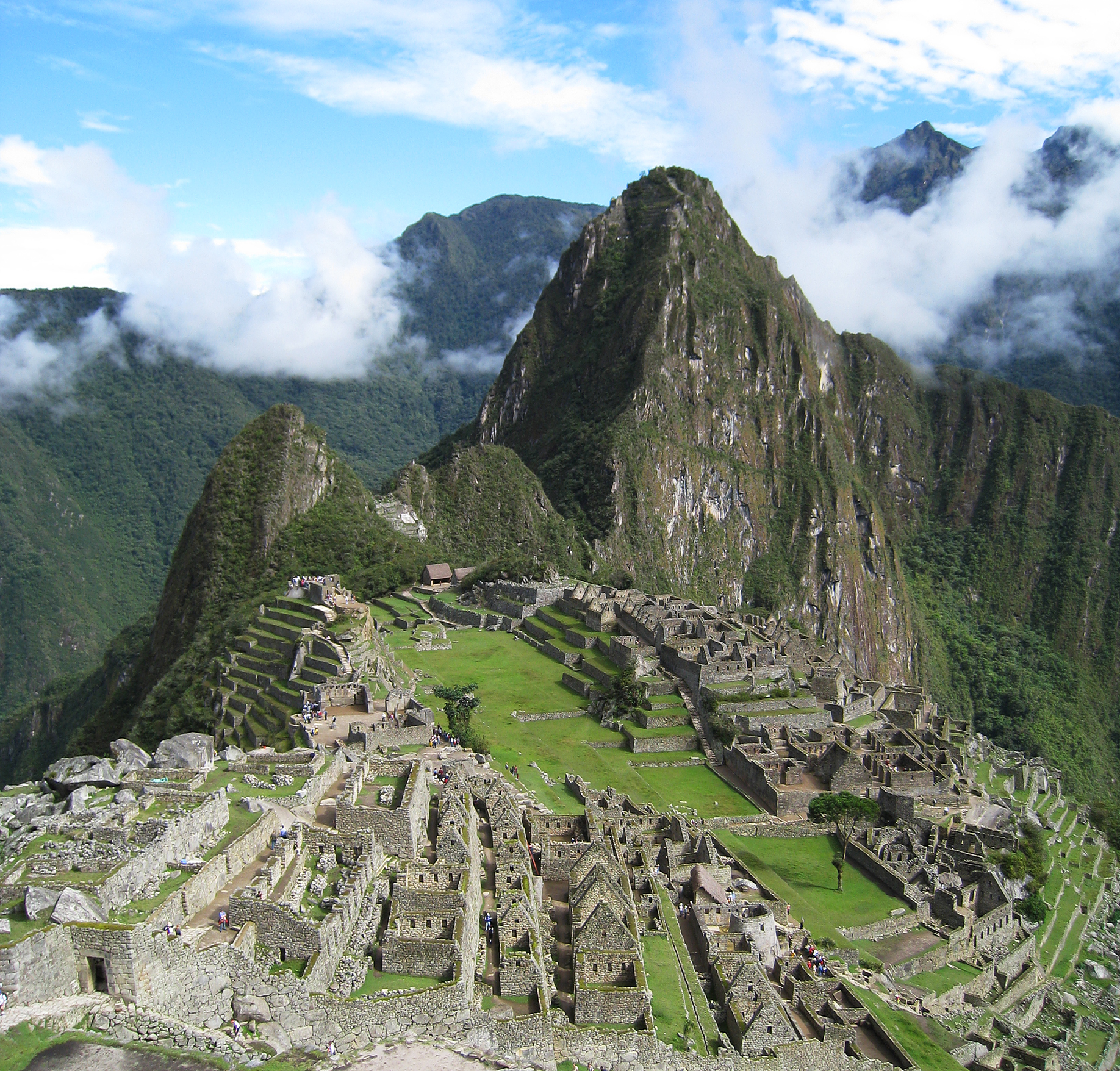
Uncontrolled development and environmental mismanagement brought about by increased tourism activity has led to the inclusion of Peru's Machu Picchu on the Watch List.

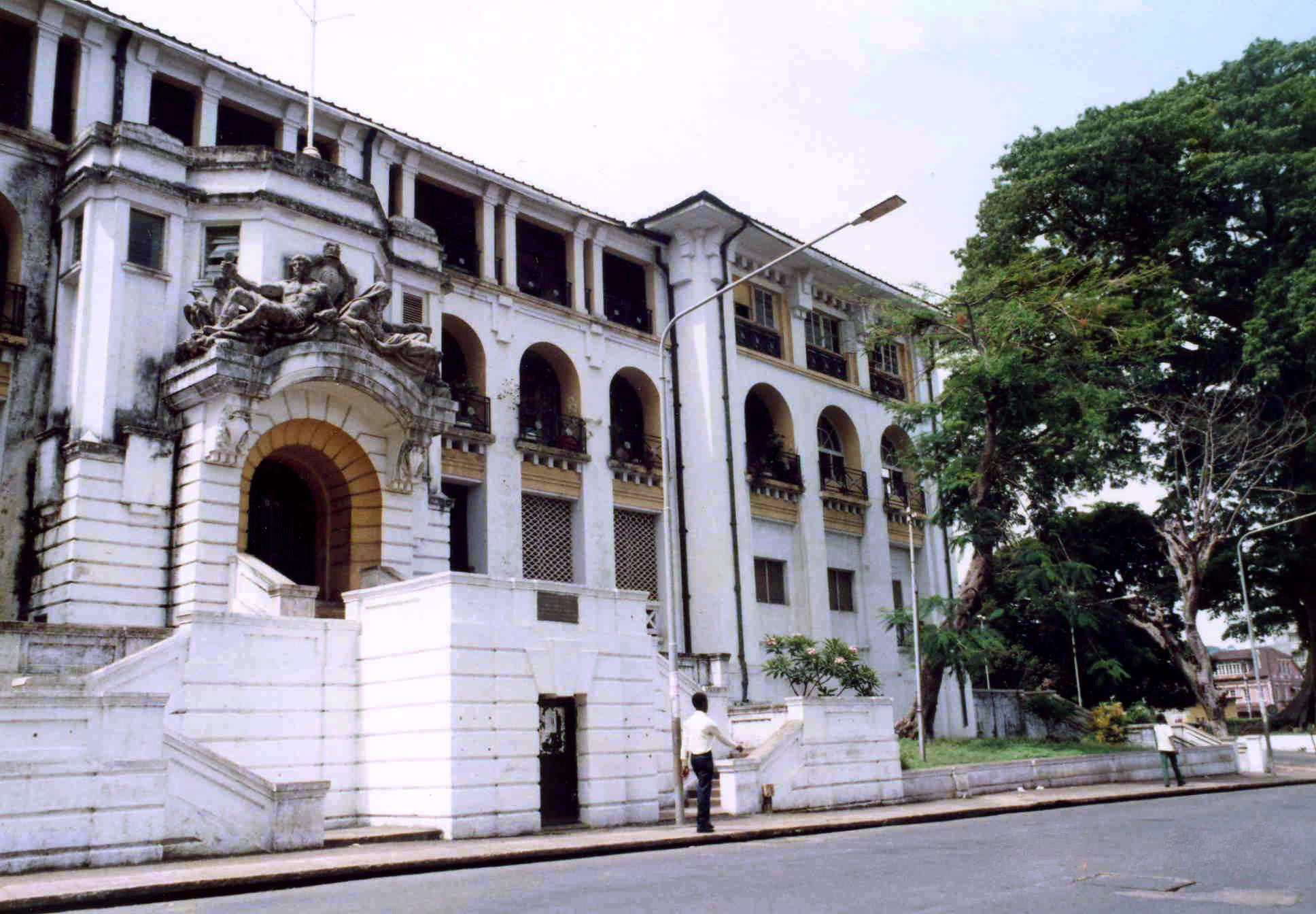
Freetown, the capital of Sierra Leone, was once known as the "Athens of West Africa."

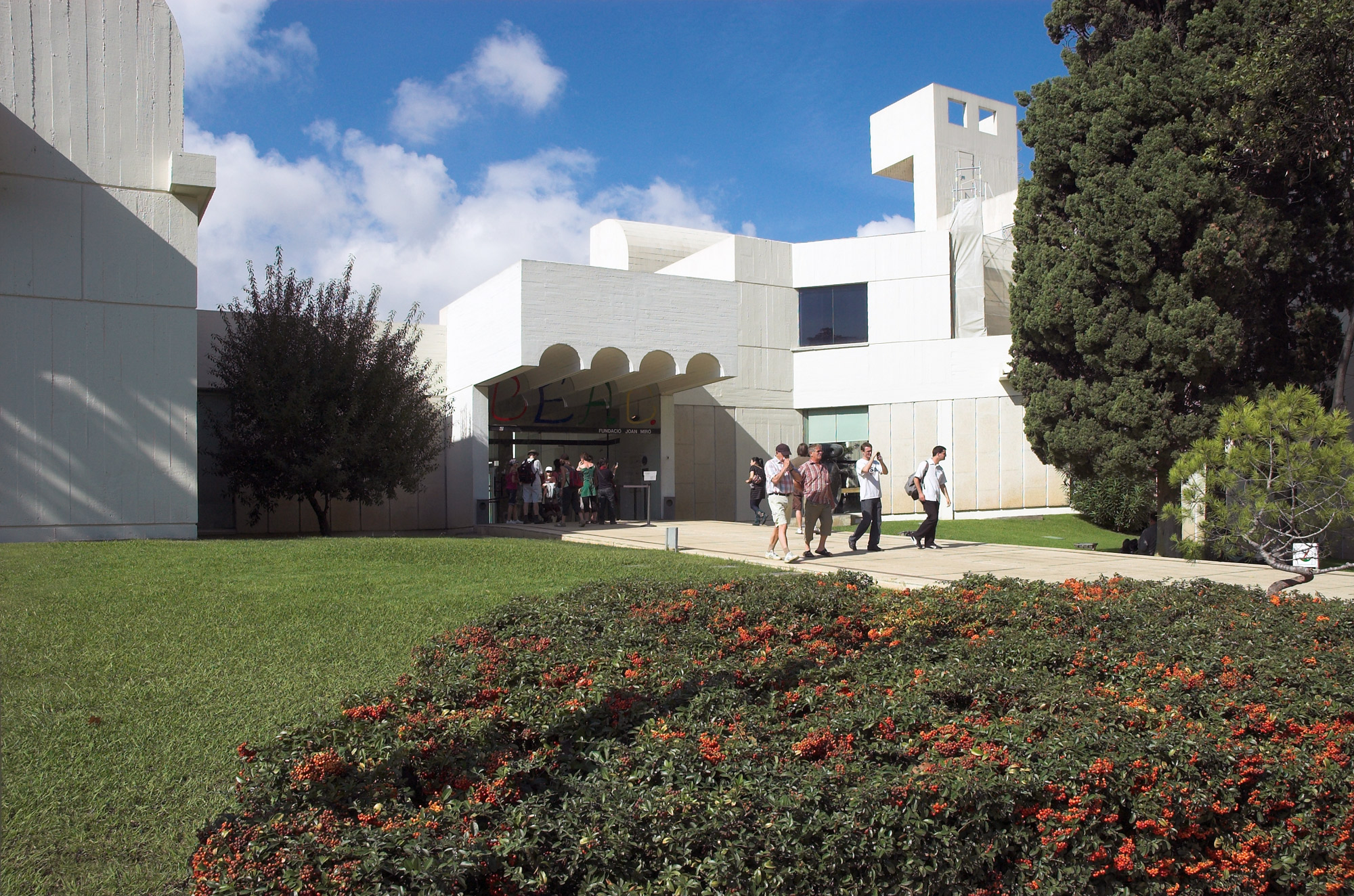
Built in 1975, the Joan Miró Foundation is a product of late-Modern architecture and is the "youngest" site on the 2008 Watch List.

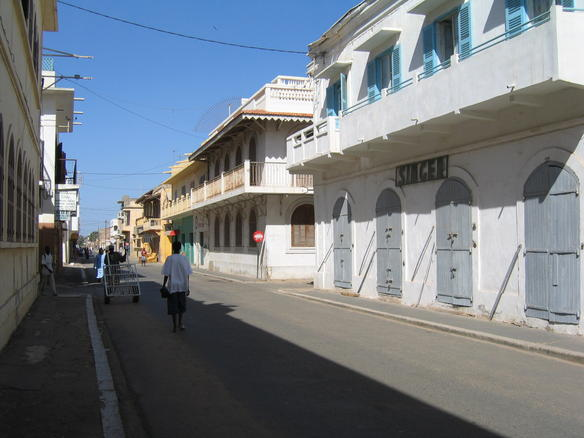
The Island of Saint-Louis in Senegal has been a UNESCO World Heritage Site since 2000.

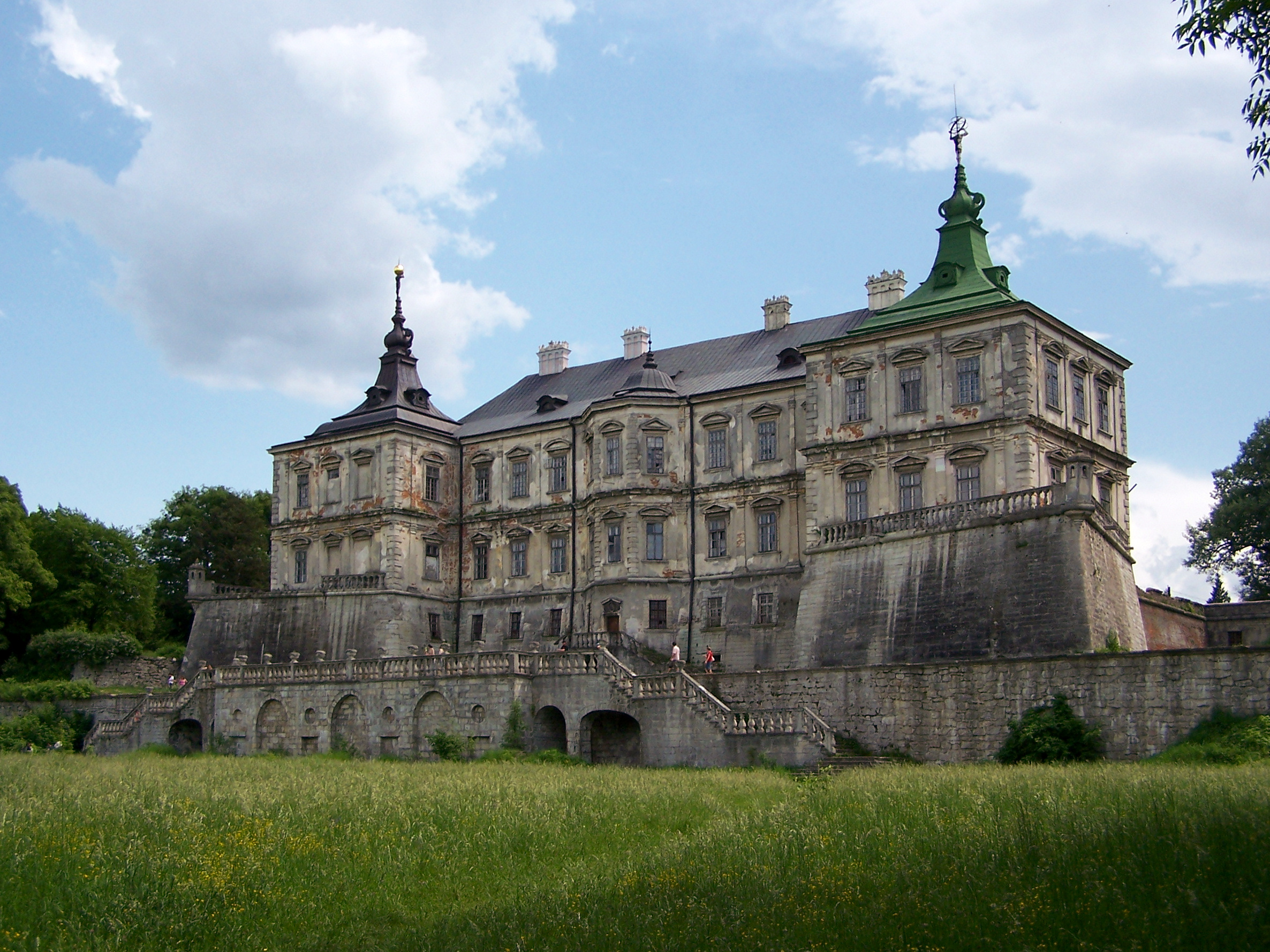
Ukraine's Pidhirtsi Castle was severely damaged during the Polish-Soviet War (1919-21). The structure was also damaged by a fire caused by a lightning strike in 1956.

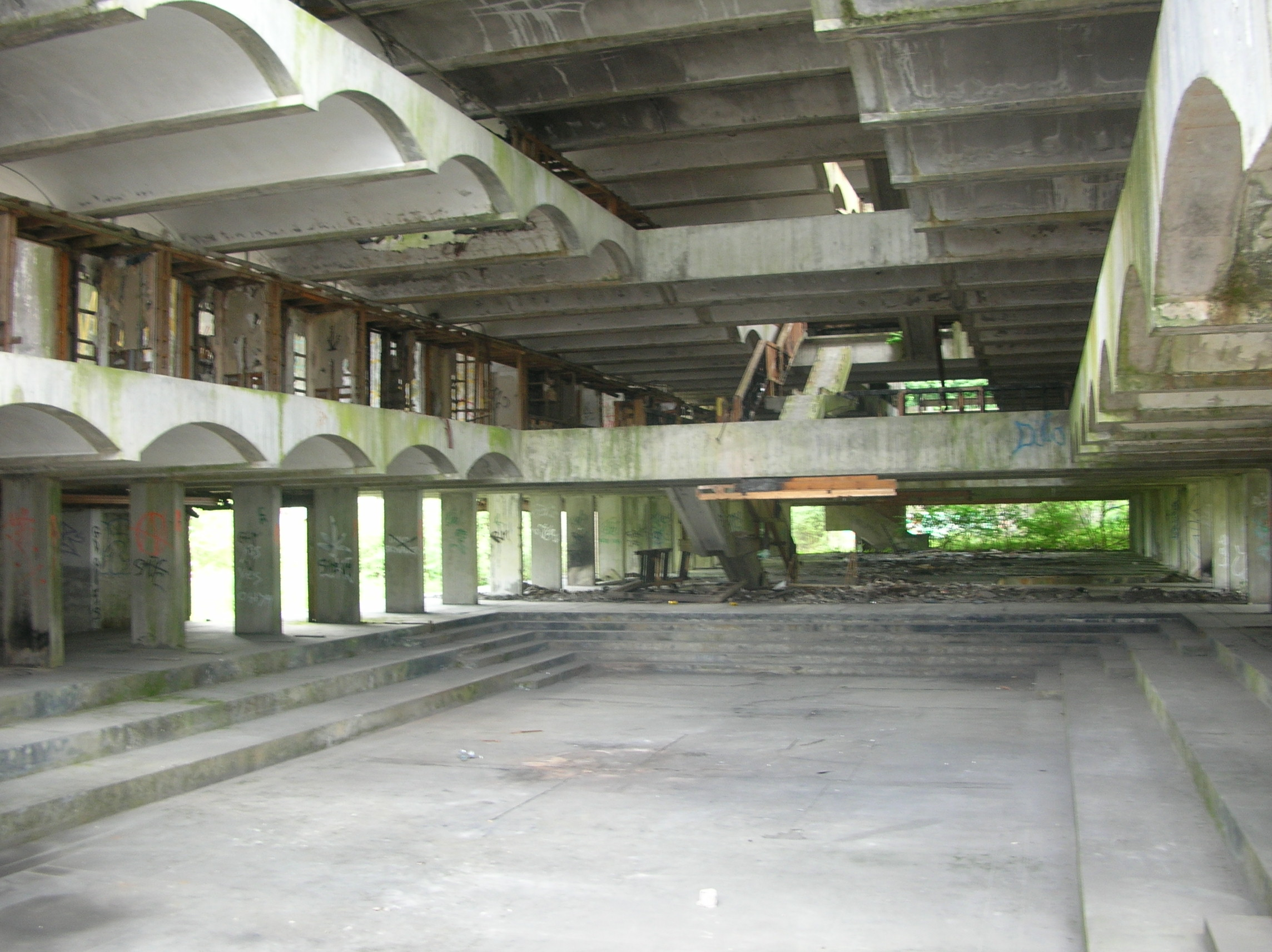
St. Peter’s College, Cardross was named as Scotland's greatest post-WWII building by the architecture magazine Prospect.

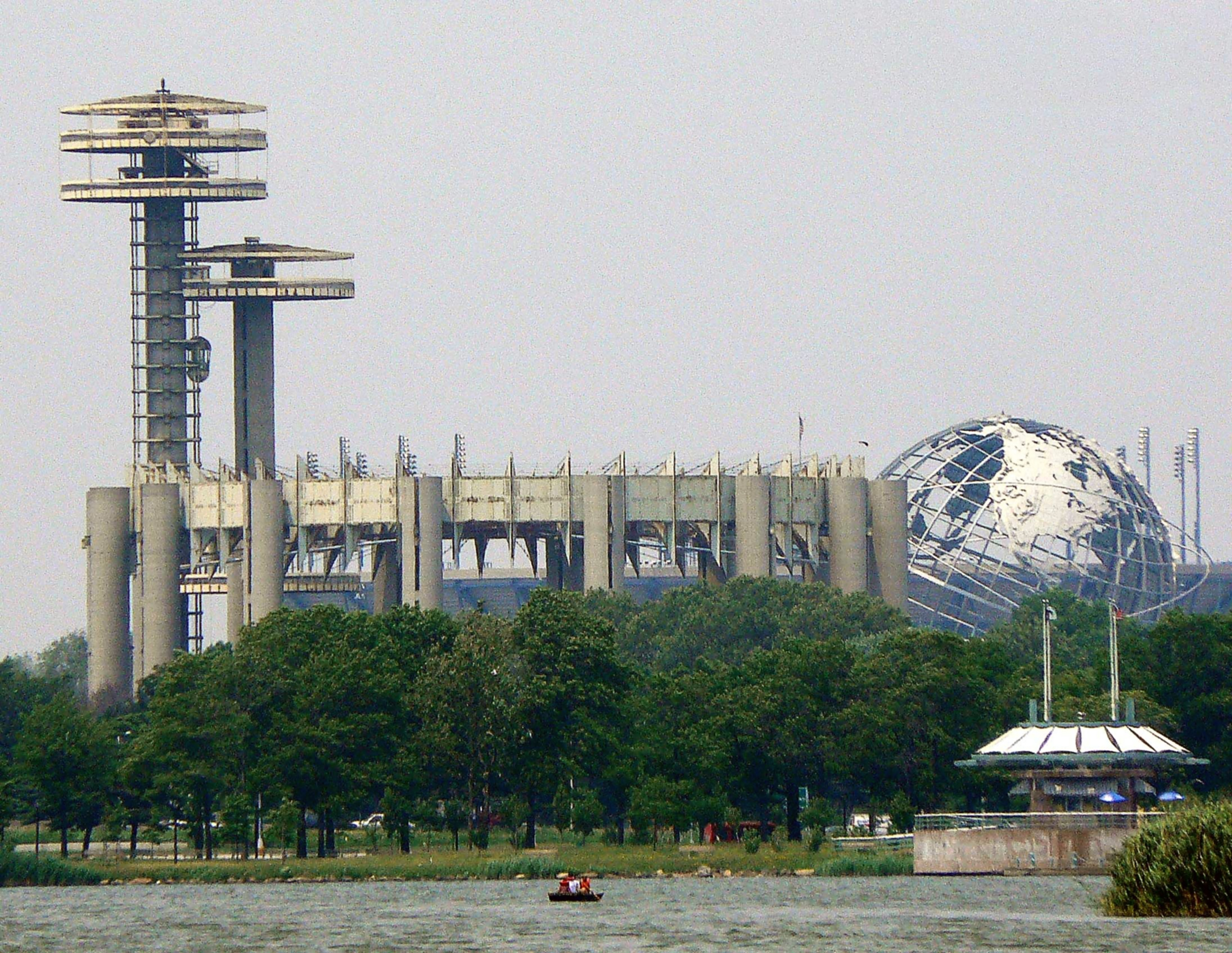
The New York State Pavilion is a remnant of the 1964 New York World's Fair. Forty years later, it is in imminent danger of collapse as its foundation starts to decay.

Number^{[A]}	Country/Territory	Site^{[B]}	Location^{[C]}	Period^{[C]}
1	Afghanistan	Buddhist Remains of Bamiyan	Bamiyan Valley	ca. AD 600
2	Afghanistan	Murad Khane	Kabul	18th century–1920
3	Afghanistan	Tepe Narenj	Kabul	5th–9th Centuries AD
4	Algeria	Medracen and el-Khroub Numidian Royal Mausolea	Constantina and Batna Region	4th–3rd Centuries BC
5	Antarctica	Scott’s Hut and the Explorers’ Heritage of Antarctica	Scott's Hut, Cape Evans, Ross Island	1899–1917
6	Argentina	Brener Synagogue	Moises Ville	1909
7	Armenia	Kumayri District	Alexandrapol, Gyumri	19th–20th Centuries
8	Australia	Dampier Rock Art Complex	Dampier Archipelago	c. 10,000 BC–Present
9	Azerbaijan	Khinalyg Village	Guba Region	17th–19th Centuries
10	Bangladesh	Sonargaon-Panam City	Sonargaon	15th–19th Centuries
11	Bosnia and Herzegovina	Sarajevo City Hall	Sarajevo	1892–1894
12	Brazil	Porangatu Historic District	Porangatu	18th–early 20th Centuries
13	Bulgaria	Novae Archaeological Site	Svishtov	AD 49–700
14	Burkina Faso	Loropeni Ruins	Poni Province	18th Century
15	Canada	Herschel Island	Yukon Territory	1890–1907
16	Chile	Montemar Institute of Marine Biology	Viña del Mar	1941–1945; 1956–1969
17	China	Modern Shanghai	Shanghai	1920–1949
18	China	Xumishan Grottoes	Ningxia Hui Autonomous Region	4th–10th Centuries AD
19	Cyprus	Famagusta Walled City	Famagusta	3rd Century BC–19th Century AD
20	Egypt	Blue Mosque (Aqsunqur Mosque)	Cairo	14th–17th Centuries
21	Egypt	Shunet el-Zebib	Abydos	c. 2750 BC
22	Egypt	West Bank of the Nile	Luxor	Paleolithic to Modern; Main Period: New Kingdom, 1540–1075 BC
23	Eritrea	Derbush Tomb	Massawa	16th Century
24	Ethiopia	Mohammadali House	Addis Ababa	c. 1900
25	France	Epailly Chapel of the Order of the Temple	Courban	1200–1330
25	Georgia	Gelati Monastery and Academy	Kutaisi	12th–14th Centuries
26	Ghana	The Wa Naa’s Palace	Wa	19th Century
27	Greece	Lesvos Historic Churches	Lesvos	5th–19th Centuries
28	Greece	Pella Macedonian Tombs	Pella	4th–2nd Centuries BC
29	Guatemala	Ceibal Archaeological Site	Sayaxche	300 BC–AD 250; AD 830–950
30	Guatemala	Capitanes Generales Palace	Antigua Guatemala	1549–1773
31	India	Amber Town	Rajasthan	11th–18th Centuries
32	India	Chettinad	Karraikudi, Tamil Nadu	19th Century
33	India	Jantar Mantar (The Observatory)	Jaipur, Rajasthan	1729; 1901 Reconstructions
34	India	Leh Old Town	Ladakh Region, Jammu & Kashmir	15th–17th Centuries
35	India	Srinigar Heritage Zone	Srinagar, Jammu & Kashmir	14th–19th Centuries
36	Indonesia	Kotagede Heritage District	Yogyakarta Special Territory	16th Century
37	Iraq	Cultural Heritage Sites of Iraq	Various Locations	Prehistoric–Present
38	Ireland	Tara Hill	County Meath	3rd Millennium BC–12th Century AD
39	Ireland	Vernon Mount	County Cork	1780s–1950
40	Israel, Jordan, Palestinian Territories & Syria	Jordan River Cultural Landscape		Prehistoric–AD 1516
41	Italy	Farnese Nymphaeum	Rome	1565–1635
42	Italy	Fenestrelle Fortress	Fenestrelle, Turin	1728–1850
43	Italy	Transhumance Cultural Landscape	Molise Region	3rd Century BC–1945
44	Italy	Viscontian Bridge-Dam	Valeggio sul Mincio	1393–1397
45	Jamaica	Falmouth Historic Town	Falmouth	1770s
46	Jordan	Khirbet et-Tannur	Tafilah, Ma'an Governorate	1st Century BC–2nd Century AD
47	Jordan	Qusayr ‘Amra	Al-'Azraq Municipality	8th Century AD
48	Libya	Wadi Mathendous Rock Art	Fezzan	8000–3000 BC
49	Macedonia	Holy Mother of God Peribleptos Church	Ohrid	1295–1767
50	Madagascar	Fianarantsoa Old City	Fianarantsoa	19th Century
51	Malta	Fort St. Elmo	Valletta	1552–1565; 1689–1877; 1900–1945
52	Mauritania	Chinguetti Mosque	Chinguetti	13th Century
53	Mexico	Chihuahua Missions	Chihuahua	16th–19th Centuries
54	Mexico	Huaca Historic Neighborhood	Veracruz	1870–1912; 1940–1950
55	Mexico	Monte Albán Archaeological Site	Oaxaca	500 BC–AD 850
56	Mexico	Teuchitlán-Guachimontones Archaeological Zone	Teuchtitlán, Jalisco	400 BC–AD 600
57	Morocco	Al-Azhar Mosque (Ain Khail Mosque)	Fez	12th Century
58	Nigeria	Ikom Monoliths of Cross River State	Ikom	Before 2000 BC
59	Pakistan	Shikarpoor Historic City Center	Sindh	17th–18th Centuries
60	Palestinian Territories	Church of the Holy Nativity	Bethlehem	AD 330–Present
61	Peru	Laraos Terraces	Laraos	1440–Present
62	Peru	Lima Historic City Center	Lima	17th–19th Centuries
63	Peru	Machu Picchu Historic Sanctuary	Urubamba Valley	15th Century
64	Peru	Macusani-Corani Rock Art	Macusani and Corani	5000–2000 BC
65	Peru	San Pedro Apostol de Andahuaylillas Church	Andahuaylillas	1570–1629
66	Peru	Santa Catalina Monastery	Arequipa	16th–18th Centuries
67	Russia	Church of the Icon of the Mother of God of the Sign	Teplovo	c. 1797
68	Russia	Mendeleev Tower	St. Petersburg	1902–1950s
69	Russia	St. Petersburg Historic Skyline	St. Petersburg	1703–1950s
70	Senegal	Ile de Saint-Louis (St. Louis Island)	Saint-Louis	18th–19th Centuries
71	Sierra Leone	Freetown Historic Monuments	Freetown	17th Century
72	Slovakia	Banská Stiavnica Calvary Complex	Banská Stiavnica	1744–1751
73	Somalia	Las Geel Rock Art	Las Geel District	4000–3000 BC
74	Spain	Joan Miró Foundation	Barcelona	1975
75	Sri Lanka	Kandy Sacred City	Kandy	c. 1470–1815
76	Sweden	Ljungberg Hall	Borlänge (Kvarnsveden)	1897–1898
77	Syria	Cyrrhus (Nebi Houri)	Azaz	230 BC–13th Century AD
78	Syria	Old Damascus	Damascus	3000 BC–Present
79	Tanzania	Kilwa Historic Sites	Kilwa	200 BC–AD 600; AD 700–1600; 18th–20th Centuries
80	Turkey	Çukur Han	Ankara	16th–17th Centuries
81	Turkey	Hasankeyf	Hasankeyf	Prehistoric–14th Century
82	Turkey	Istanbul Historic Walls	Istanbul	5th–15th Centuries
83	Turkey	Meryem Ana (Mother of God) Church	Göreme, Cappadocia	Early 11th Century
84	Turkey	Red Church	Güzelyurt, Sivrihisar, Cappadocia	6th Century
85	Ukraine	Pidhirtsi Castle	Pidhirtsi	17th–18th Centuries
86	United Kingdom	Mavisbank House	Midlothian, Scotland	1720–1750
87	United Kingdom	Richhill House	County Armagh, Northern Ireland	1655–1698
88	United Kingdom	Wilton’s Music Hall	London	1858, with earlier fabric dating from the 1720s
89	United Kingdom	St. Peter’s College, Cardross	Cardross, Scotland	1960s
90	United States of America	Florida Southern Historic Campus	Lakeland, Florida	1938–1950s
92	United States of America	Historic Neighborhoods of New Orleans	New Orleans, Louisiana	18th–20th Centuries
93	United States of America	Historic Route 66	Various Cities, Towns and Villages between Chicago, Illinois and Los Angeles, California	1926–1970
94	United States of America	Main Street Modern	Various Locations	1945–1975
95	United States of America	New York State Pavilion	Flushing, New York	1964
96	United States of America	Salk Institute	La Jolla, California	1959–1965
97	United States of America	Tutuveni Petroglyph Site	Coconino County, Arizona	1200–Present
98	Uzbekistan	Ayaz Kala	Karakalpakstan	4th Century BC–7th Century AD
99	Uzbekistan	Madrasa Rashid	Bukhara	15th–18th Centuries
100	Zimbabwe	Bumbusi National Monument	Matabeland	Prehistoric; 18th–19th Centuries AD

== Statistics by country/territory ==
The following countries/territories have multiple sites entered on the 2008 Watch List, listed by the number of sites:

Number of sites	Country/Territory
7	United States of America
6	Peru
5	India and Turkey
4	Italy, Mexico and United Kingdom
3	Afghanistan, Egypt, Jordan^{[D]}, Russia and Syria^{[D]}
2	China, Greece, Guatemala, Ireland, Israel (area C) and Uzbekistan

== Notes ==
A. Numbers list only meant as a guide on this article. No official reference numbers have been designated for the sites on the Watch List.
B. Names and spellings used for the sites were based on the official 2008 Watch List as published.
C. The references to the sites' locations and periods of construction were based on the official 2008 Watch List as published.
D. Tally includes the transfrontier site of Jordan River Cultural Landscape.
