= Kizil Kilise (disambiguation) =

Kizilkilise, Kızıl Kilise (Turkish 'red church'), in Armenian Kizilkilisa, may refer to:

== In Armenia ==
- Artsni, formerly Kizilkilisa
- Karmravan, formerly Kizilkilisa Armyanskaya

== In Turkey ==
- Nazimiye, formerly Kızılkilise, a town in Tunceli province
- Kizil Kilise, a 7th-century church in Cappadocia
- A 13th-century church in the village of Bayraktar, Bayburt
