= Bouziane =

Bouziane is an Arabic surname. Notable people with the name include:

- Ali Bouziane (born 1977), Algerian basketball player
- Anass Bouziane (born 2006), Dutch football midfielder
- Chiara Bouziane (born 1997), German footballer
- Hadj Sadok Bouziane (born 1987), Algerian footballer
- Kheira Bouziane-Laroussi (born 1953), French politician
- Malik Bouziane (born 1978), Algerian boxer
- Mohamed Amine Bouziane (born 1996), Algerian footballer
- Mohamed Bouziane (born 1971), Algerian handball player
- Mounir Bouziane (born 1991), French footballer
- Rose Bouziane (1906–2006), Lebanese-American activist
- Sid-Ahmed Bouziane (born 1983), French footballer
- Wassim Bouziane (born 2006), Dutch football winger

== Places ==
- Aïn Bouziane, town and commune in Skikda Province, Algeria
- Hamma Bouziane (town), town and commune in Constantine Province, Algeria
- Hamma Bouziane District, district in Constantine Province, Algeria
