= Ibn Ziad District =

Coordinates: 36.3833°N 6.4667°E

Ibn Ziad District دائرة ابن زياد
- District
- Map of Algeria highlighting Constantine Province

- Map of Constantine Province highlighting Ibn Ziad District
- Country: Algeria
- Province: Constantine
- District seat: Ibn Ziad

Population (1998)
  - Total: 23,489
- Time zone: UTC+01 (CET)
- Municipalities: 2

Aïn Abid is a district in Constantine Province, Algeria. It was named after its capital, Ibn Ziad. As of the 1998 census, it is the least populated district in the province.

== Municipalities ==
The district is further divided into 2 municipalities:

- Ibn Ziad
- Messaoud Boudjeriou
