= Zighoud Youcef District =

Coordinates: 36.5331°N 6.7124°E

Zighoud Youcef District دائرة زيغود يوسف
- District
- Map of Algeria highlighting Constantine Province

- Map of Constantine Province highlighting Zighoud Youcef District
- Country: Algeria
- Province: Constantine
- District seat: Zighoud Youcef

Population (1998)
  - Total: 39,298
- Time zone: UTC+01 (CET)
- Municipalities: 2

Zighoud Youcef District is a district in Constantine Province, Algeria. It was named after its capital, Zighoud Youcef.

== Municipalities ==
The district is further divided into 2 municipalities:

- Zighoud Youcef
- Béni Hamidane
