= Aïn-Sbir =

- location
- Location of Ain Sbir, Algeria within Constantine Province

- Location of Constantine within Algeria
- Coordinates: 36°21′N 6°36′E
- Country: Algeria
- Province: Constantine Province

Government
  - President: A. Chibane (2007–12)
- Elevation: 727 m (2,385 ft)
  - Density: 239/km^{2} (620/sq mi)
- Time zone: UTC+1 (CET)
- Climate: Csa

Aïn-Sbir is a location in Algeria. The nearest town is Ali Mendjeli.

== Geography ==
Aïn-Sbir is located at 36.22833°N 6.53083°E in the province of Constantine, in the northern part of Algeria, 300 km east of the capital, Algiers . Aïn Sbir is located 727 meters above sea level.

The highest point in the vicinity is 825 meters above sea level, 1.0 km north of Ain Sbir.

The nearest city is Constantine, 16.9 km north of Ain Sbir. The area around Aïn Sbir consists mainly of farmland.

== Population ==
Aïn Sbir has 239 inhabitants per square kilometer.
