= Hamawi =

Ḥamawī (Arabic: حماوي) or (al-Hamawi, al-Hammawi) is an Arabic name and surname from the Arabic root (ḥamā ح م ى) meaning protection or defense (to protect, to guard), for example: حمى الوطن = “He protected the homeland”, indicating bravery and selflessness.

It can also refer to father-in-law in Modern Standard Arabic, also (حماي ḥamāi).

“Al-ḥamma / Al-ḥammah (الحمّة)” also means natural hot springs, and is used for several places to indicate protection, like:

Hamma (District), Algeria.
Hama (Sohag), Egypt.
Hamma, Tunisia.
Hama, Syria.

Notable people with the name and surname include:

- Amin Al-Hamawi (born 2003), Iraqi footballer
- Hamma Hammami (born 1952), Tunisian politician
- Sa'd al-Din al-Hamawi (1190–1252), Persian Sufi writer
- Mohamad Al Hamawi (born 1984), Syrian footballer
- Yaqut al-Hamawi (1179–1229), Muslim scholar of European Byzantine ancestry in the late Abbasid period

The surname is of Jewish Sephardic origin in modern-day Spain and Portugal before the inquisition of 1492. https://jewishgen.org/databases/sephardic/SephardimComNames.html
