= In the Shadow of the Harem =

1928 film

- Directed by: André Liabel; Léon Mathot
- Written by: Lucien Besnard; André Liabel; Léon Mathot
- Starring: Léon Mathot; Louise Lagrange; Jackie Monnier
- Cinematography: Willy Faktorovitch
- Production company: Paris International Film
- Distributed by: Franco Films
- Release date: 6 July 1928
- Country: France
- Languages: Silent; French intertitles

In the Shadow of the Harem (French: Dans l'ombre du harem) is a 1928 French silent drama film directed by André Liabel and Léon Mathot and starring Mathot, Louise Lagrange and Jackie Monnier.

== Cast ==
- Léon Mathot as L'émir Si Abd en Nasser
- Louise Lagrange as Simone de Montfort
- Jackie Monnier as Princesse Djebellen Nour
- René Maupré as Roger de Montfort
- André Volbert as Le gouverneur
- Thérèse Kolb as Servante Habida
- Bouziane as Le policier
- Georget as L'eunuque
- Luce Joly
- Robert Mérin
- Roger Hoguenet
- Diana Kotchaki

== Bibliography ==
- Krautz, Alfred. International Directory of Cinematographers Set and Costume Designers in Film: France. Saur, 1983.
- Shafik, Viola. Arab Cinema: History and Cultural Identity. American University in Cairo Press, 2007.
- Slavin, David Henry . Colonial Cinema and Imperial France, 1919–1939: White Blind Spots, Male Fantasies, Settler Myths. JHU Press, 2001.
