= El Khroub District =

Coordinates: 36.2633°N 6.6936°E

El Khroub District دائرة الخروب
- District
- Map of Algeria highlighting Constantine Province

- Map of Constantine Province highlighting El Khroub District
- Country: Algeria
- Province: Constantine
- District seat: El Khroub

Population (1998)
  - Total: 134,779
- Time zone: UTC+01 (CET)
- Municipalities: 3

El Khroub is a district in Constantine Province, Algeria. It was named after its capital, El Khroub. As of the 1998 census, it is the second most populous District of the Province, after Constantine.

== Municipalities ==
The district is further divided into 3 municipalities:

- El Khroub
- Aïn Smara
- Ouled Rahmoun
