= Didouche =

Didouche may refer to:

- Mourad Didouche (1927–1955), a veteran of the Algerian War of independence (1954–1962).
- Didouche Mourad, a town and commune in Constantine Province within Algeria.
