= Aïn Abid District =

Coordinates: 36.2325°N 6.9442°E

Aïn Abid District دائرة عين أعبيد
- District
- Map of Algeria highlighting Constantine Province

- Map of Constantine Province highlighting Aïn Abid District
- Country: Algeria
- Province: Constantine
- District seat: Aïn Abid

Population (1998)
  - Total: 39,827
- Time zone: UTC+01 (CET)
- Municipalities: 2

Aïn Abid is a district in Constantine Province, Algeria. It was named after its capital, Aïn Abid.

== Municipalities ==
The district is further divided into 2 municipalities:

- Aïn Abid
- Ben Badis
