= Hamma Bouziane District =

Coordinates: 36.3833°N 6.6000°E

Hamma Bouziane District دائرة حامة بوزيان
- District
- Map of Algeria highlighting Constantine Province

- Map of Constantine Province highlighting Hamma Bouziane District
- Country: Algeria
- Province: Constantine
- District seat: Hamma Bouziane

Population (1998)
  - Total: 91,573
- Time zone: UTC+01 (CET)
- Municipalities: 2

Hamma Bouziane is a district in Constantine Province, Algeria. It was named after its capital, Hamma Bouziane.

== Municipalities ==
The district is further divided into 2 municipalities:

- Hamma Bouziane
- Didouche Mourad
