= Huangduobao =

Huangduobao 黄铎堡镇
- Town
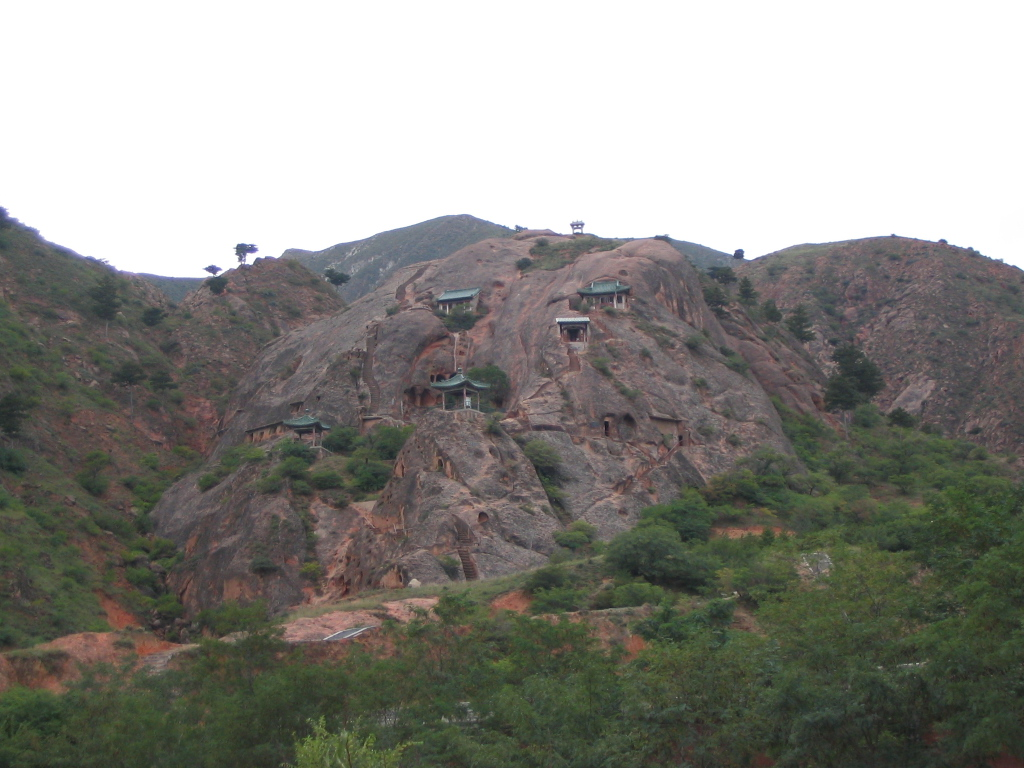
- Xumishan Grottoes
- Interactive map of Huangduobao
- Coordinates: 36°18′14″N 106°04′05″E
- Established: 1108 AD

Population (2020)
  - Total: 24,174
- Area code: 0954

Huangduobao is a town of Yuanzhou, Guyuan, Ningxia, China.

In 2020 the population was 24,174.

The town is best known for the Huangduo fortress, historically known as Pingxia, and the Xumishan Grottoes. Huangduobao can be traced back to Pingxia city, built in 1108 AD.

Numerous Marigold cultivations surround the town.
