= Aïn Abid =

Aïn Abid عين عبيد
- City
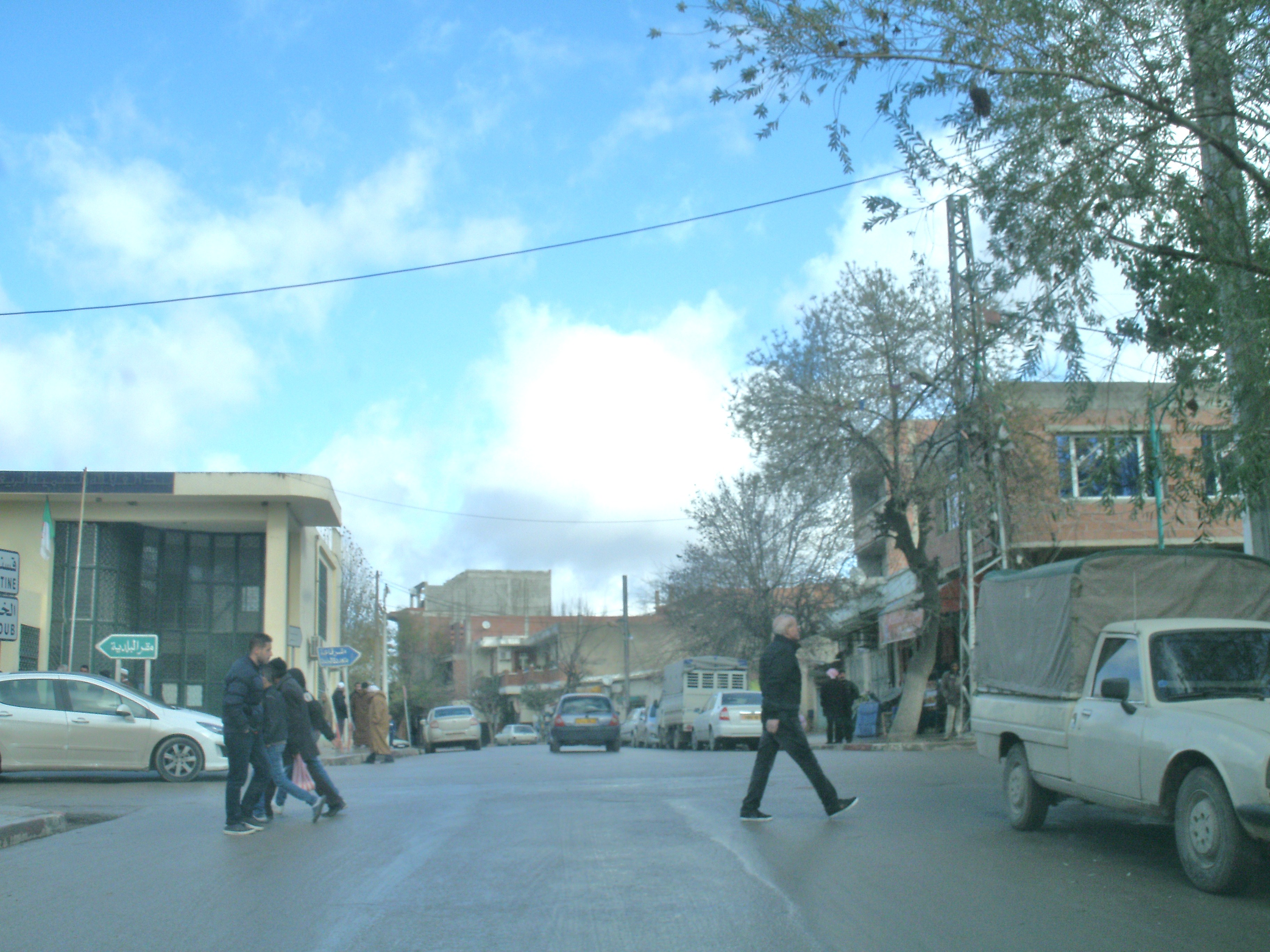
- Aïn Abid
- Motto: "From the people, for the people"
- Location of Aïn Abid within the Constantine Province

- Location of Aïn Abid within Algeria
- Coordinates: 36.2325044°N 6.944046°E
- Country: Algeria
- Province: Constantine Province
- District: Aïn AbidDistrict
- APC: 2012-2017

Government
  - Type: Municipality
  - Mayor: Faouzi Boumendjel (PLJ)

Area
  - Total: 125.02 sq mi (323.80 km^{2})

Population (2008)
  - Total: 31,743
- Time zone: UTC+1 (CET)
- Postal code: 25015
- ISO 3166 code: CP

Aïn Abid is the capital of the Aïn Abid District in Constantine Province, Algeria.
