= Aïn Smara =

Municipality in Constantine, Algeria

Ain Smara عين السمارة
- Municipality
- Location in Algeria
- Coordinates: 36°15′59″N 6°29′48″E
- Country: Algeria
- Province: Constantine
- Founded: 1854

Area
  - Total: 175 km^{2} (68 sq mi)

Population (2008)
  - Total: 32,548
  - Density: 186/km^{2} (482/sq mi)
- Time zone: UTC+1 (CET)

Ain Smara is a municipality in Constantine Province, Algeria. Its original name is Aïn Smara.

== Geography ==
It is bordered by Ali Mendjeli to the east, Oued Athmania (Mila Province) to the west, Ibn Ziad to the north and El Khroub to the south. The Hricha Amar quarter of Ain Smara is one of the biggest Constantine quarters.

== Demographics ==
Ain Smara has a population of about 32,548 people (2008) with 175 km² land area.

== History ==
Ain Smara was founded in 1854. Its popularity was due to the existence of the Chettaba mountains. During the Ottoman era (1515–1830) it was close to Turc baylek Constantine. It was colonized by the French from 1830 to 1962 and remained a quarter of Oued Athmania until the administrative division of 1984, when Ain Smara became a municipality.

== Sport ==
Football is the most popular sport. The two main football clubs are Ittihad Riyadi Beladiat Aïn Smara (IRBAS) and Mouloudia Beladiat Aïn Smara (MBAS). They play in sand stadiums.

Several other sports use Bachiri Mokhtar complex, including judo, karate, handball and volleyball.

== Education ==
There are five primary schools;

- Ali Boukerzaza
- Amar Bourgoud
- Amar Belkerfa
- Hricha Amar 1
- Hricha Amar 2

Its three secondary schools are:

- Mustafa Kateb technicom
- Mohamed Nadjar
- Chmachma Ali

== Mosques ==
Five mosques are present:

- Okba Bin Nafaa - Amar Bin Yasser
- Mussa Ibn Nussair - Essalam
- El farouk
- Masjad Al-nour
