= Djamel Mesbah =

Algerian footballer (born 1984)

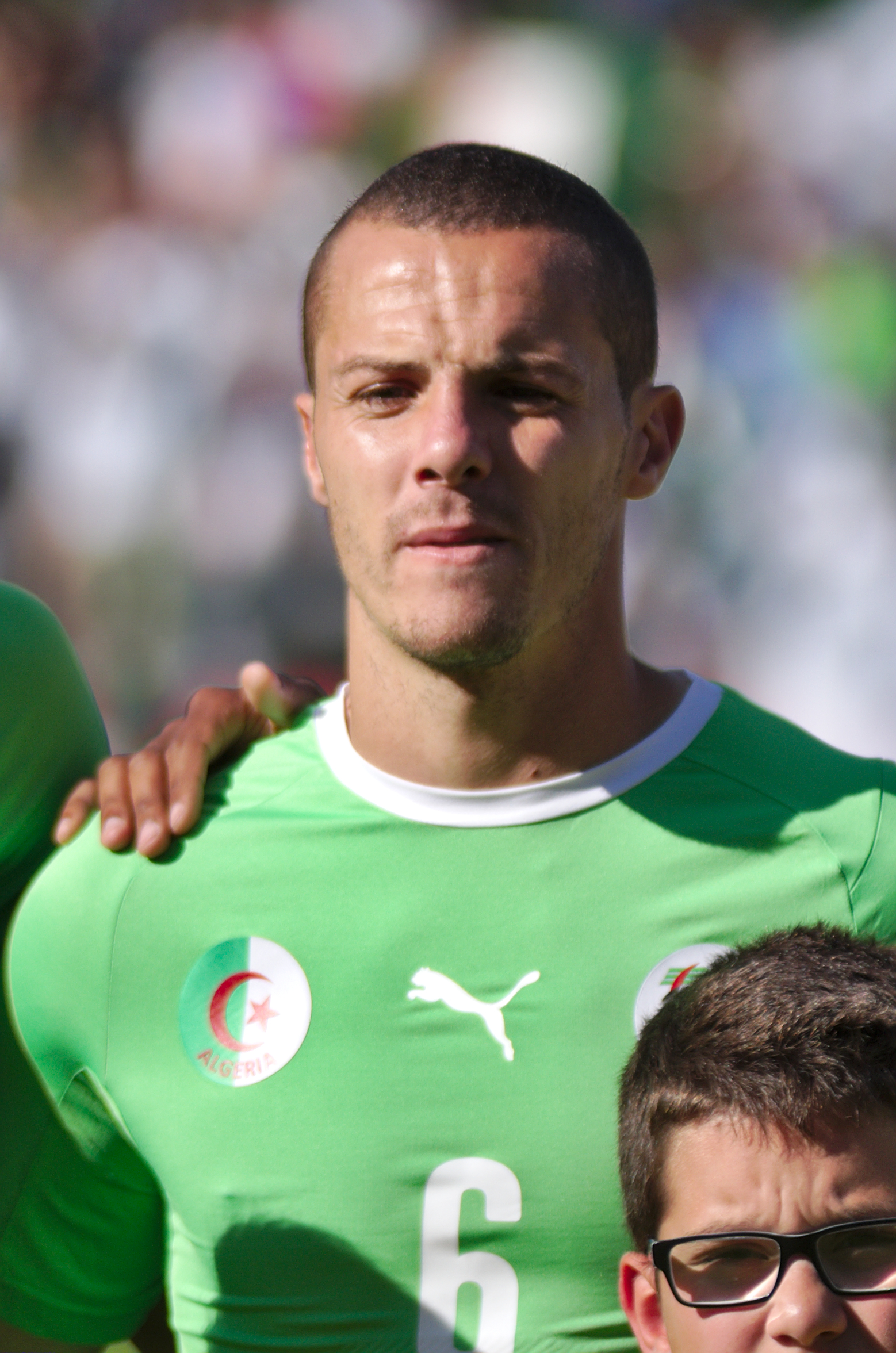
- Mesbah with Algeria in 2014

Personal information
- Full name: Djamel Eddine Mesbah
- Date of birth: 9 October 1984 (age 42)
- Place of birth: Zighoud Youcef, Algeria
- Position: Left-back

Team information
- Current team: Lebanon (assistant coach)

Youth career
- 1995–2001: US Annecy-le-Vieux (74)
- 2001–2003: Servette

Senior career*
Years	Team	Apps	(Gls)
2003–2004	Servette	11	(3)
2004–2006	Basel	11	(1)
2006	→ Lorient (loan)	0	(0)
2006–2008	Aarau	60	(1)
2008–2009	Luzern	6	(0)
2008–2009	→ Avellino (loan)	27	(2)
2009–2012	Lecce	82	(6)
2012–2013	Milan	9	(0)
2013–2014	Parma	10	(1)
2014	→ Livorno (loan)	14	(1)
2014–2016	Sampdoria	23	(0)
2016–2017	Crotone	10	(0)
2017	Lausanne-Sport	4	(0)
2019	Étoile Carouge	0	(0)
Total		267	(15)

International career
2010–2017	Algeria	36	(1)

Managerial career
- 2019–2020: Fujairah (assistant)
- 2021–2023: Algeria A' (assistant)
- 2023–2024: Al-Markhiya (assistant)
- 2024–2025: Algeria A' (assistant)
- 2026–: Lebanon (assistant)
- * Club domestic league appearances and goals

Djamel Eddine Mesbah (Arabic: جمال الدين مصباح; born 9 October 1984) is an Algerian professional football coach and a former player who is the assistant coach of the Lebanon national team.

An Algerian international, Mesbah was a member of the Algeria national team at two World Cups, the 2010 FIFA World Cup in South Africa and the 2014 FIFA World Cup in Brazil, as well as 2013 Africa Cup of Nations in South Africa. As of 27 March 2019, he has 35 international caps and one goal for the Desert Foxes.

== Club career ==
=== Early career ===
Born in Zighoud Youcef, Algeria, Mesbah began his playing career in the junior ranks of French club US Annecy-le-Vieux before being spotted by scouts from Swiss side Servette FC in 2001. He progressed through the ranks at Servette and made his senior debut in the 2003–04 Swiss Super League season, playing in 11 games and scoring 3 goals.

=== Switzerland ===
In the summer of 2004, he left the club as it was facing financial difficulties and joined FC Basel. Used mostly as a substitute, he would go on to make just 11 appearances and score 1 goal. In January 2006, he was loaned out to FC Lorient who were playing in Ligue 2 at the time. However, he was injured before he could make his debut and never featured for them.

In the summer of 2006, he signed with FC Aarau, a Swiss club playing in the countries second division. He stayed there for two seasons and was a starter the entire time. He was signed by FC Luzern on 1 July 2008, but made only 6 appearances the whole year, all of which were coming off the substitute bench.

=== Avellino ===
On 1 September 2008, he was signed by Avellino, the first Italian club in his career.

=== Lecce ===
In July 2009 he was signed by U.S. Lecce. At Lecce he played mostly as a left sided midfielder, but occasionally as a central midfielder or even a left sided wing-back. His ability to play many positions well, attracted the interest of a few Italian clubs.

=== AC Milan ===
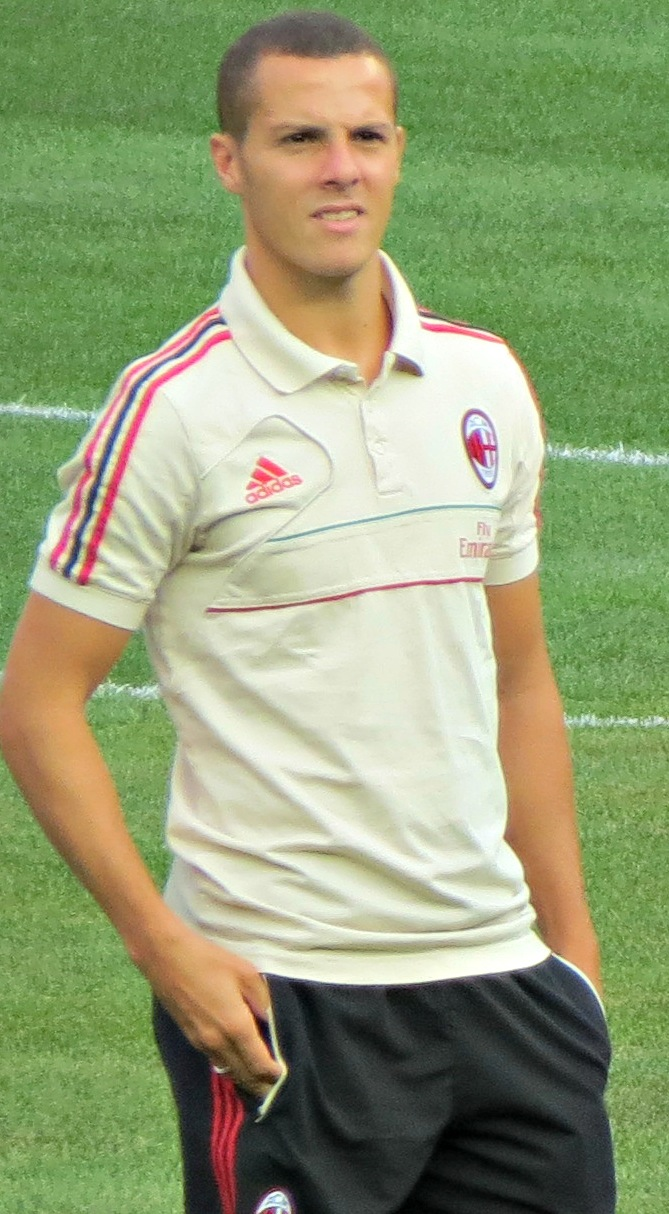
Mesbah with Milan in 2012

On 18 January 2012, US Lecce announced that Mesbah would be leaving the club to join AC Milan. The following day, Milan confirmed the transfer, announcing that Mesbah had signed a four-and-a-half-year contract with the club for an €1.2 million transfer fee

On 26 January 2012, Mesbah made his debut for Milan, starting in the 2011–12 Coppa Italia quarter-final tie against Lazio. Mesbah played the entire match with Milan going on to win 3–1. On 20 March 2012, Mesbah scored his first goal for Milan, in a 2–2 draw with Juventus in the Semi-Finals of the 2011–12 Coppa Italia. His goal tied the game 1–1, but proved ineffective as Milan drew in extra time to exit the cup on aggregate 4–3. He made a total of twelve appearances in all competitions for Milan, including two in the UEFA Champions League, one against Arsenal and the other against Barcelona. The away leg at Arsenal was his first appearance in the competition.

In the 2012–13 season, Mesbah was used even more sparingly, and, due to form and injury, he made just two appearances in the first half of the season. This prompted Milan to sell the player to Parma F.C. in January 2013, in a cashless swap with Cristian Zaccardo.

=== Parma ===
Mesbah was again used sparingly at Parma and he made seven appearances until the end of the 12/13 season. The next season Mesbah made just four further appearances and so went out on loan to A.S. Livorno Calcio in January 2014.

=== Livorno (loan) ===
At Livorno, Mesbah was a constant starter. He played as their left sided wingback in a 3-5-2 formation but unfortunately was unable to help Livorno in their push to avoid relegation.

=== Sampdoria ===
Mesbah signed for U.C. Sampdoria late on 1 September 2014 (swap with Juan Antonio), penning a three-year deal with the Genovese club. It was his fourth different club since January 2012.

=== Lausanne ===
Mesbah played for Lausanne-Sport in Switzerland in 2017.

=== Étoile Carouge ===
Mesbah joined Étoile Carouge FC in January 2019.

== International career ==
In May 2010, Mesbah was called up for the first time to the Algeria national team by Rabah Saâdane for a two-week training camp in Crans-Montana, Switzerland in preparation for the 2010 World Cup. Mesbah made his debut for the team two weeks later, on 28 May 2010, as a starter in a friendly against the Republic of Ireland. He was included in the final 23-man squad for the World Cup.

== Managerial career ==
In May 2026, Mesbah was appointed assistant coach of the Lebanon national team, as part of Madjid Bougherra's technical staff.

== Career statistics ==
=== Club ===
As of 1 July 2018

Appearances and goals by club, season and competition
Club	Season	League			Cup		Continental		Total		Ref.
Club	Season	Division	Apps	Goals	Apps	Goals	Apps	Goals	Apps	Goals	Ref.
Servette	2003–04	Swiss Super League	11	3	0	0	–	–	11	3	
Basel	2004–05	Swiss Super League	9	1	0	0	1	0	10	1	
Basel	2005–06	Swiss Super League	2	0	1	0	0	0	3	0	
Basel	Total		11	1	1	0	1	0	13	1	–
Lorient (loan)	2005–06	Ligue 2	0	0	0	0	0	0	0	0	
FC Aarau	2006–07	Swiss Super League	27	0	1	0	–	–	28	0	
FC Aarau	2007–08	Swiss Super League	33	1	2	0	–	–	35	1	
FC Aarau	Total		60	1	3	0	–	–	63	1	–
Luzern	2008–09	Swiss Super League	6	0	0	0	–	–	6	0	
Avellino (loan)	2008–09	Serie B	27	2	0	0	–	–	27	2	
Lecce	2009–10	Serie B	36	3	2	0	0	0	38	3	
Lecce	2010–11	Serie A	34	2	0	0	0	0	34	2	
Lecce	2011–12	Serie A	12	1	1	0	0	0	13	1	
Lecce	Total		82	6	3	0	0	0	84	6	–
Milan	2011–12	Serie A	8	0	2	1	2	0	12	1	
Milan	2012–13	Serie A	1	0	0	0	1	0	2	0	
Milan	Total		9	0	2	1	3	0	14	1	–
Parma	2012–13	Serie A	7	0	0	0	0	0	7	0	
Parma	2013–14	Serie A	3	1	1	0	0	0	4	1	
Parma	Total		10	1	1	0	0	0	11	1	–
Livorno	2013–14	Serie A	14	1	0	0	0	0	15	1	
Sampdoria	2014–15	Serie A	16	0	0	0	0	0	16	0	
Sampdoria	2015–16	Serie A	7	0	1	0	0	0	8	0	
Sampdoria	Total		23	0	1	0	0	0	24	0	–
Crotone	2016–17	Serie A	10	0	0	0	0	0	10	0	
Lausanne-Sport	2017–18	Swiss Super League	4	0	1	0	0	0	5	0	
Career total			267	15	12	1	4	0	283	16	–

=== International ===
As of 27 March 2019

Appearances and goals by national team and year
National team	Year	Apps	Goals
Algeria	2010	5	0
Algeria	2011	4	0
Algeria	2012	6	0
Algeria	2013	10	0
Algeria	2014	8	1
Algeria	2015	1	0
Algeria	2016	0	0
Algeria	2017	1	0
Total		35	1

Scores and results list Algeria's goal tally first, score column indicates score after each Mesbah goal.

List of international goals scored by Djamel Mesbah
No.	Date	Venue	Opponent	Score	Result	Competition
1	11 October 2014	Kamuzu Stadium, Blantyre, Malawi	Malawi	2–0	2–0	2015 Africa Cup of Nations qualification

== Honours ==
Basel

- Swiss Super League: 2004–05
