= Artsni =

Artsni Արծնի
- Location within Armenia
- Coordinates: 41°12′51″N 44°22′12″E
- Country: Armenia
- Marz (Province): Lori Province
- Elevation: 1,700 m (5,600 ft)

Population (2011)
  - Total: 239
- Time zone: UTC+4
  - Summer (DST): UTC+5

Artsni (Armenian: Արծնի) is a village located in the Lori Province of Armenia.

== History ==
Since May 1989, after the outbreak of the Nagorno-Karabakh conflict, the village of Artsni has been inhabited with Armenian refugees from Azerbaijan and Karabakh, mainly from Getashen. The village had a former Azerbaijani population.
