= Ben Badis, Constantine =

Coordinates: 34°57′N 0°55′W

Ben Badis, Algeria
- Commune and town
- Interactive map of Ben Badis, Algeria
- Country: Algeria
- Province: Constantine Province

Population (1998)
  - Total: 13,869
- Time zone: UTC+1 (CET)

Ben Badis, Algeria is a town and commune in Constantine Province, Algeria. According to the 1998 census it has a population of 13,869.
