= Messaoud Boudjeriou =

Coordinates: 36°25′28″N 6°28′21″E

Messaoud Boudjeriou بلدية مسعود بوجريو
- Commune and town
- Interactive map of Messaoud Boudjeriou
- Country: Algeria
- Province: Constantine Province

Area
  - Total: 41.16 sq mi (106.60 km^{2})
- Time zone: UTC+1 (CET)
- Postal code: 25250

Messaoud Boudjeriou (Arabic: بلدية مسعود بوجريو is a town and commune in Constantine Province, Algeria. Formerly called Aïn Kerma, it named after Messaoud Boudjeriou who was an Algerian revolutionary (1930-1961).
