= Xumishan Grottoes =

Buddhist cave temples in Ningxia, northwest China

Coordinates: 36°16′28″N 105°59′07″E

- 须弥山石窟
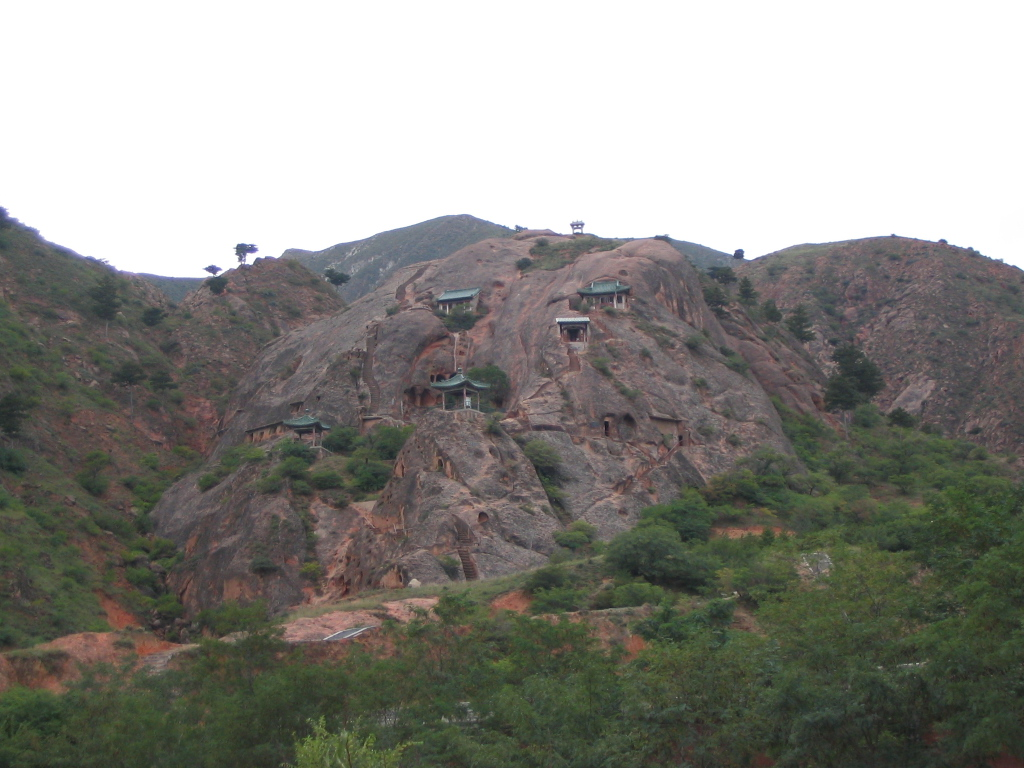

Religion
- Affiliation: Buddhism

Location
- Location: Huangduobao, Yingzhou District, Guyuan

The Xumishan Grottoes (Chinese: 须弥山石窟) are a collection of more than 130 Buddhist cave temples, built between the fifth century until the tenth century, on the eastern edge of Mount Xumi in the Ningxia Hui Autonomous Region of China.

== History ==
Construction began during the Northern Wei dynasty (368-534) and were put under periodic reconstruction during later dynasties until the Tang dynasty (618-906). The site was situated along the Silk Road, an important route for the spread of Buddhism. The influence of this trade route is apparent in the decorative motifs, with influences drawn from India and Central Asia. Prior to the construction of the grottoes, the area was known as Fengyishan.

== The Site ==
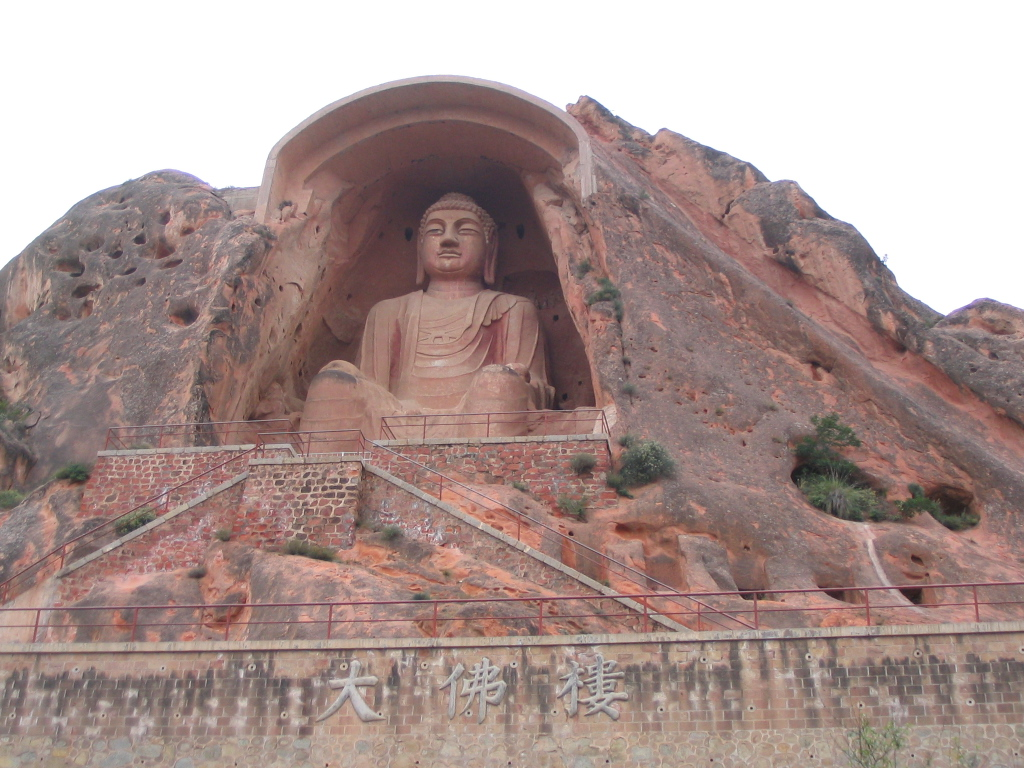
A Buddha at the Grottoes

The site has been subdivided into 5 scenic sites: Dafo Tower, Zisun Palace, Yuanguang Temple, Xiangguo Temple and Taohua Cave. Within the grottoes, statues, wall paintings and inscribed stelae can be found. Carved into red sandstone cliffs, many of the caves have little to no decorative elements. It is thought that the grottoes may have served to house monks.

The site's most iconic element is a 65-foot depiction of the seated future Buddha. While the Buddha is currently protected by a large fence, it has been subjected to erosion and improper conservation.

== Threats ==
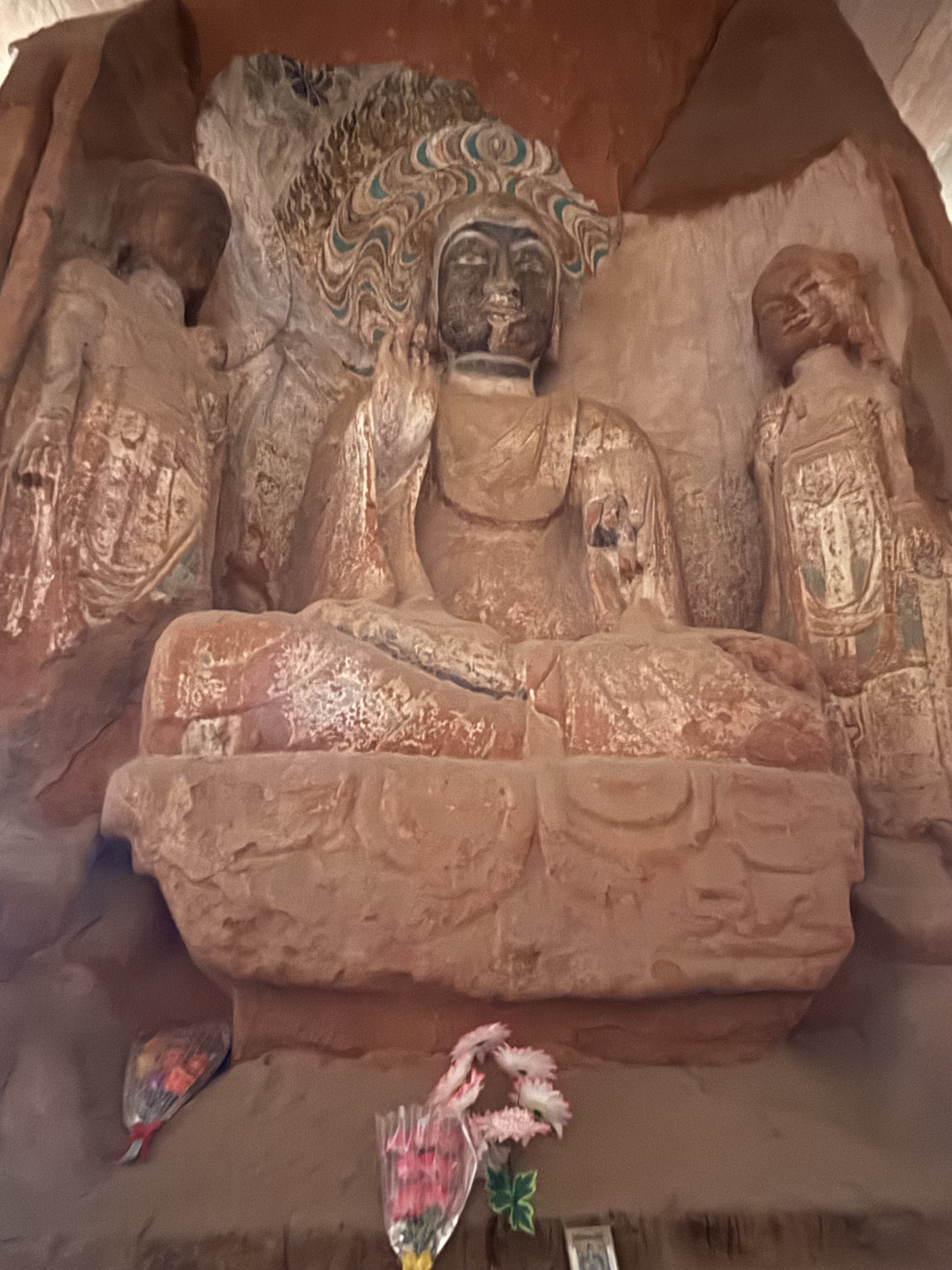
Xumishan Grottoes 76

While the area has been protected by China since 1982 as a National Level Cultural Relic Protected Site, there are many threats to its survival. The caves are threatened by exposure to the elements (particularly wind and sand erosion), earthquakes, looting, vandalism and insufficient management. The site has been listed among the top 100 endangered architectural and cultural sites in the world.

Additionally, improper architectural conservation techniques have been employed at the site, including the use of cement on the seated Buddha in 1982.

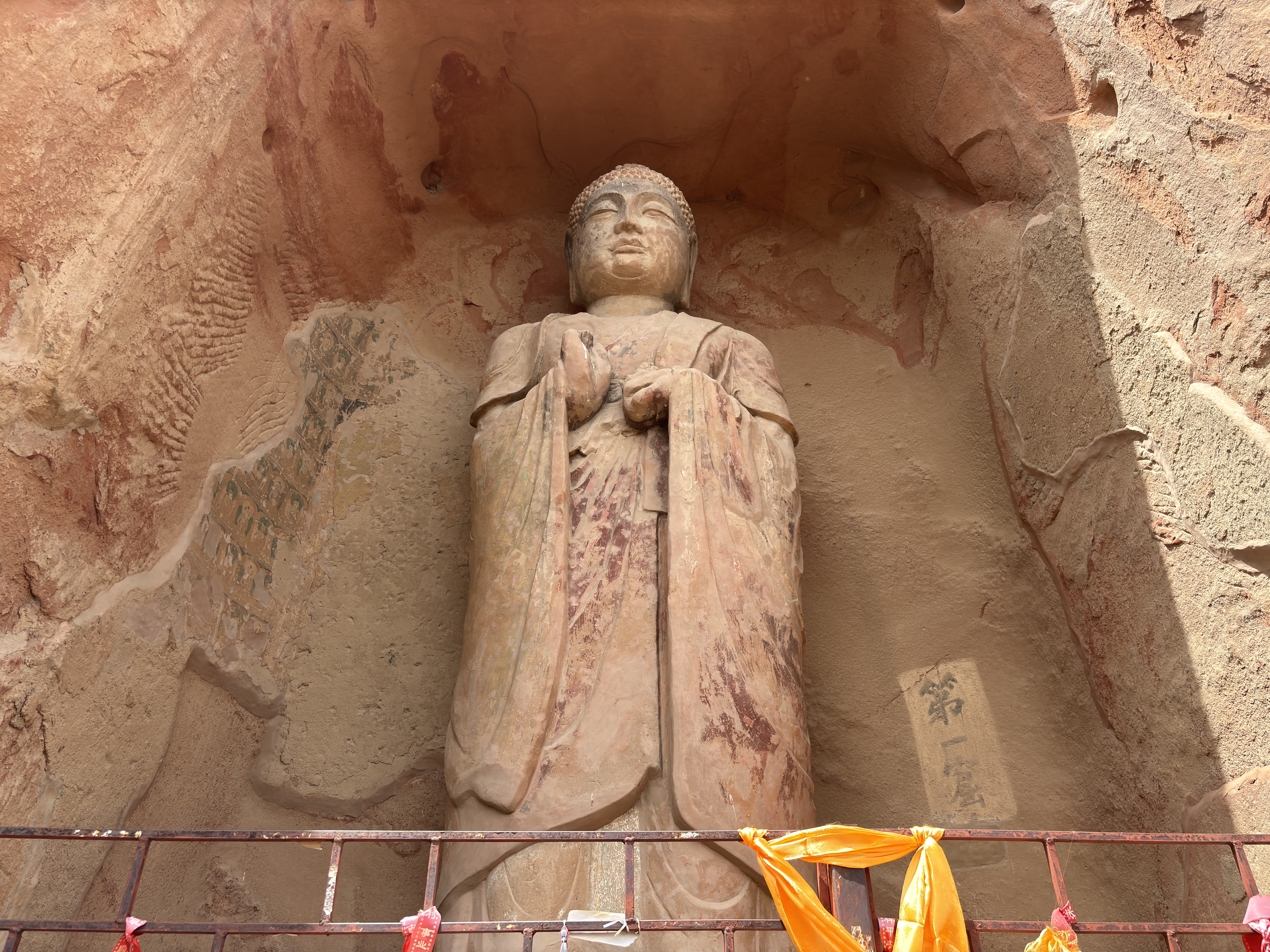
Xumishan Grottoes 35
