= Wadi Mathendous =

Archaeological site in Libya

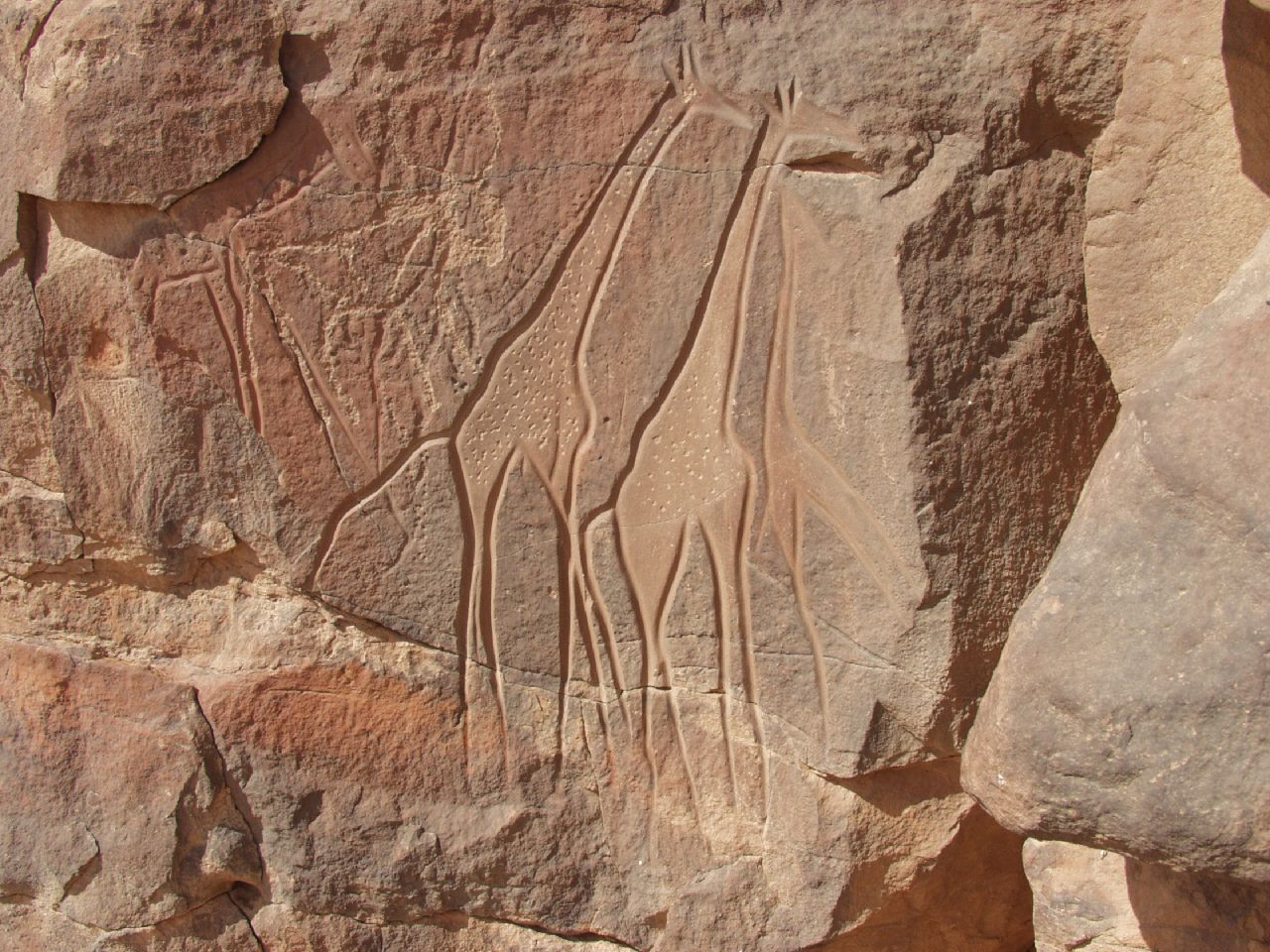
- Engraving of giraffes
- Interactive map of Wadi Mathendous
- 25.7634°N 12.1704°E
- Type: Rock art
- Location: Wadi al Hayaa, Libya

History
- Built: c. 6000 BC

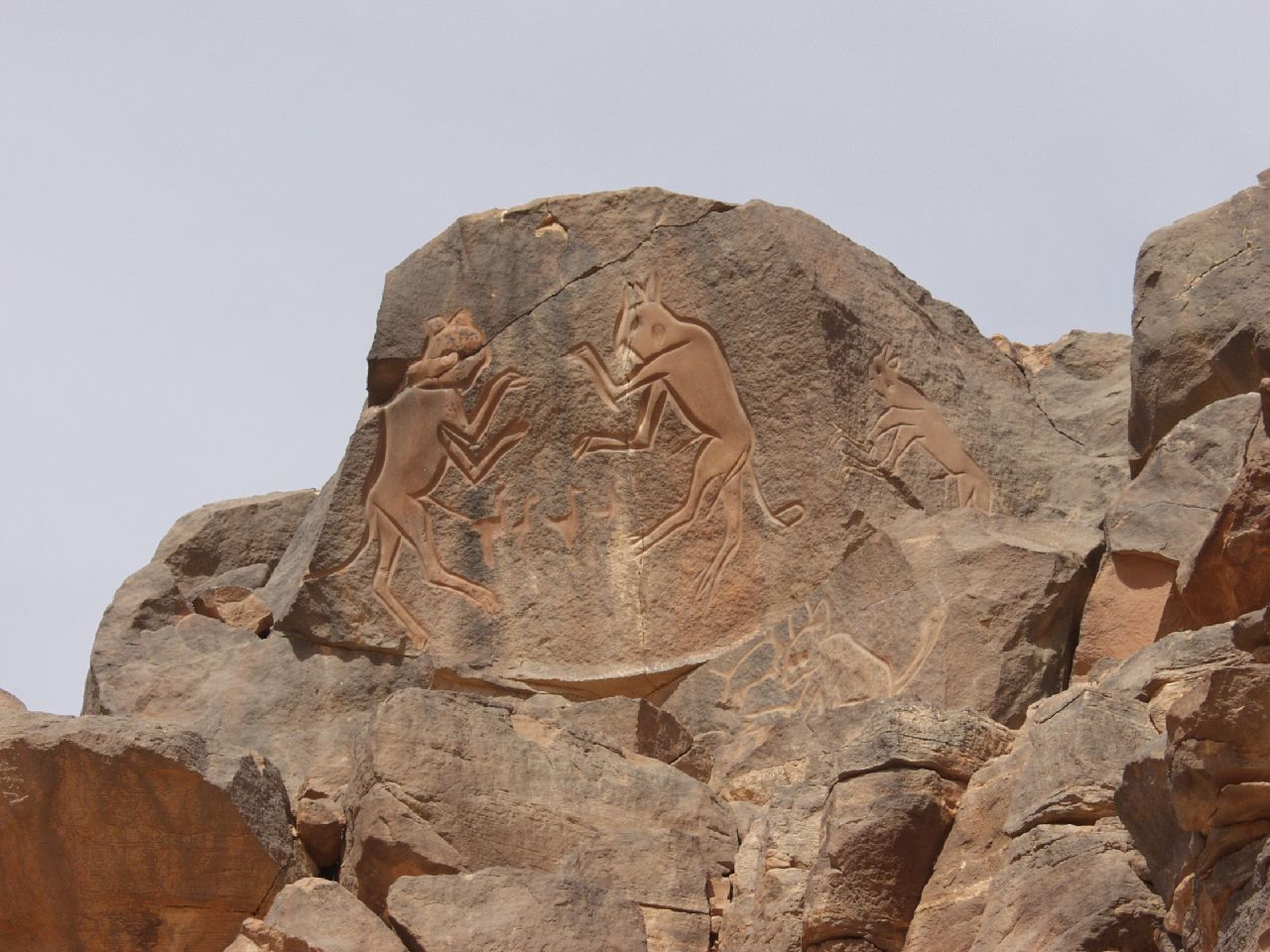
Engraving of the Fighting Cats (Meercatze) at Wadi Mathendous

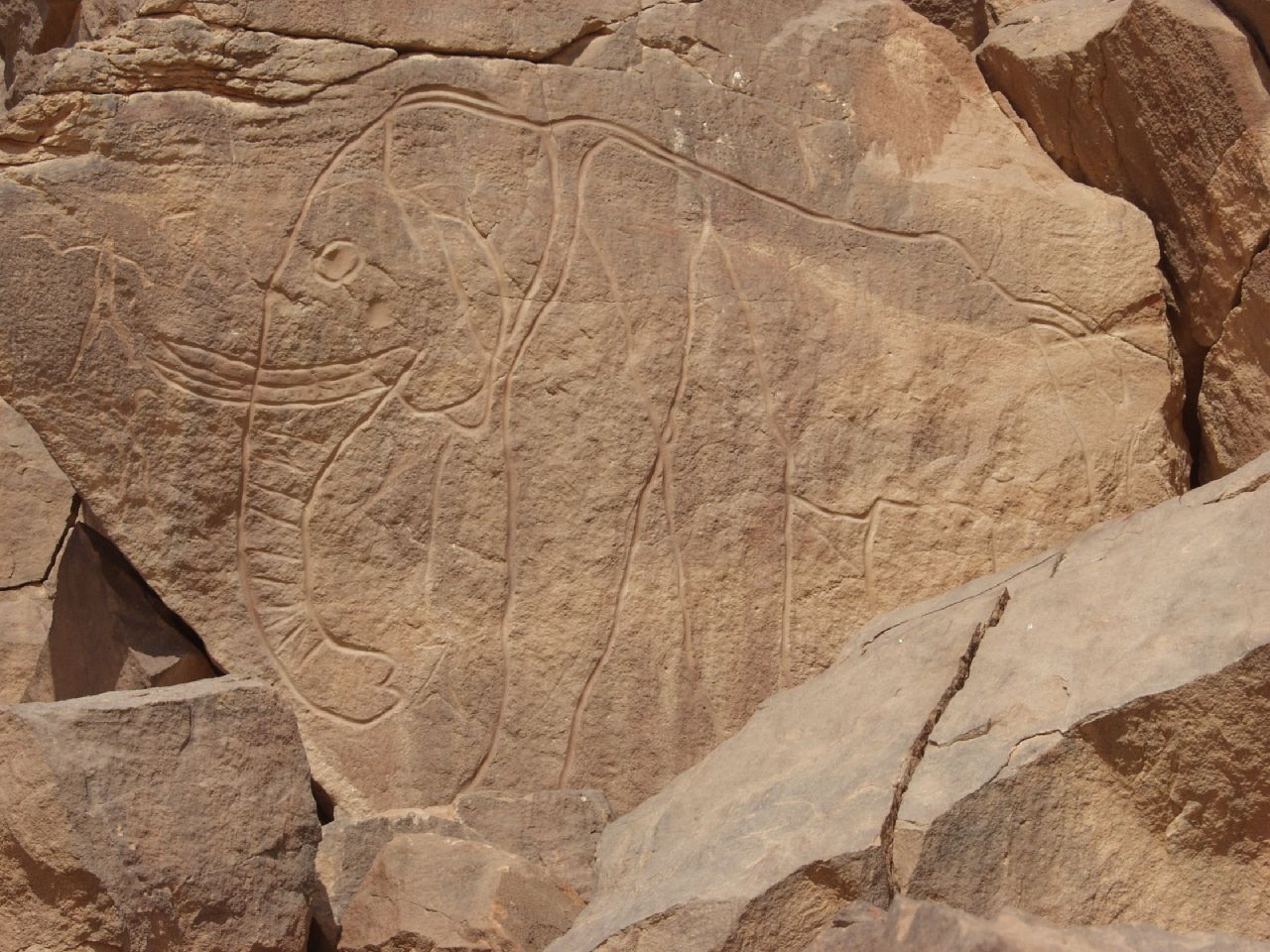
Petroglyph of an elephant at Wadi Mathendous

Wadi Mathendous is a prehistoric archaeological site in the Mesak Settafet escarpment, located in the southwestern Fezzan region in Libya. It contains many petroglyphs of figures and objects, as well as other rock art. The chiseled animals include elephants, giraffes, aurochs, wildcats, and crocodiles. These rock engravings and cave paintings have been dated to the Neolithic period, around 6000 BC.

== On postage stamps ==
The General Posts and Telecommunications Company of the Libyan government at the time, dedicated an issue of postage stamps to the rock engravings of Wadi Mathendous. The issue is made of five stamps and was released in 1978, January 1st (ref. Scott catalogue n.711-715 - Michel catalogue n.624-628).

== See also ==
- Saharan rock art
- The 'Fighting Cats' and the Rock Art of Messak Settafet
