= Anass Bouziane =

Dutch footballer (born 2006)

Personal information
- Date of birth: 22 December 2006 (age 19)
- Place of birth: Zaandam, Netherlands
- Height: 1.81 m (5 ft 11 in)
- Position: Midfielder

Team information
- Current team: Heerenveen
- Number: 49

Youth career
- OFC
- –2022: Fortuna Wormerveer
- 2022–2024: Volendam
- 2026–: Heerenveen

Senior career*
Years	Team	Apps	(Gls)
2024–2026	Volendam	5	(0)
2026–	Heerenveen	1	(0)
- * Club domestic league appearances and goals as of 19 September 2026

Anass Bouziane (born 22 December 2006) is a Dutch professional footballer who plays as a midfielder for Eredivisie club Heerenveen.

== Career ==
Born in Zaandam, Bouziane began his youth career with OFC, later captained Fortuna Wormerveer's under‑16s, and joined the Volendam academy in 2022.

He led Volendam's under-18s to the KNVB youth cup in 2023–24 and, on 5 June 2024, signed his first professional contract, binding him to the club until June 2026.

Bouziane made his senior debut on 17 September 2024, starting in a 2–0 home win over Dordrecht in the Eerste Divisie. He finished the 2024–25 season with five league appearances as Volendam won the division and secured promotion to the Eredivisie.

In the summer of 2026, Bouziane joined Heerenveen and was originally assigned to the Under-21 squad. About a month into the season, he was included in the senior squad due to an injury to Dirk Proper and on 19 September 2026 he made his Eredivisie debut as a late substitute against Sparta Rotterdam.

== Personal life ==
Born in the Netherlands, Bouziane is of Moroccan descent and holds dual Dutch and Moroccan citizenship. He is the eldest of several brothers involved in professional or academy football; younger twin Wassim plays for AZ Alkmaar.

== Career statistics ==
As of match played 17 January 2025

Appearances and goals by club, season and competition
Club	Season	League			KNVB Cup		Other		Total	
Club	Season	Division	Apps	Goals	Apps	Goals	Apps	Goals	Apps	Goals
Volendam	2024–25	Eerste Divisie	5	0	1	0	—		6	0
Career total			5	0	1	0	0	0	6	0

== Honours ==
Volendam

- Eerste Divisie: 2024–25
