= Béni Hamidane =

Coordinates: 36°30′20″N 6°32′59″E

- Commune and town
- Interactive map of Béni Hamidane
- Country: Algeria
- Province: Constantine Province

Population (1998)
  - Total: 8,197
- Time zone: UTC+1 (CET)

Béni Hamidane is a town and commune in Constantine Province, Algeria. According to the 1998 census it has a population of 8,197.
