= Kızıl Kilise =

Kızıl Kilise Red Church
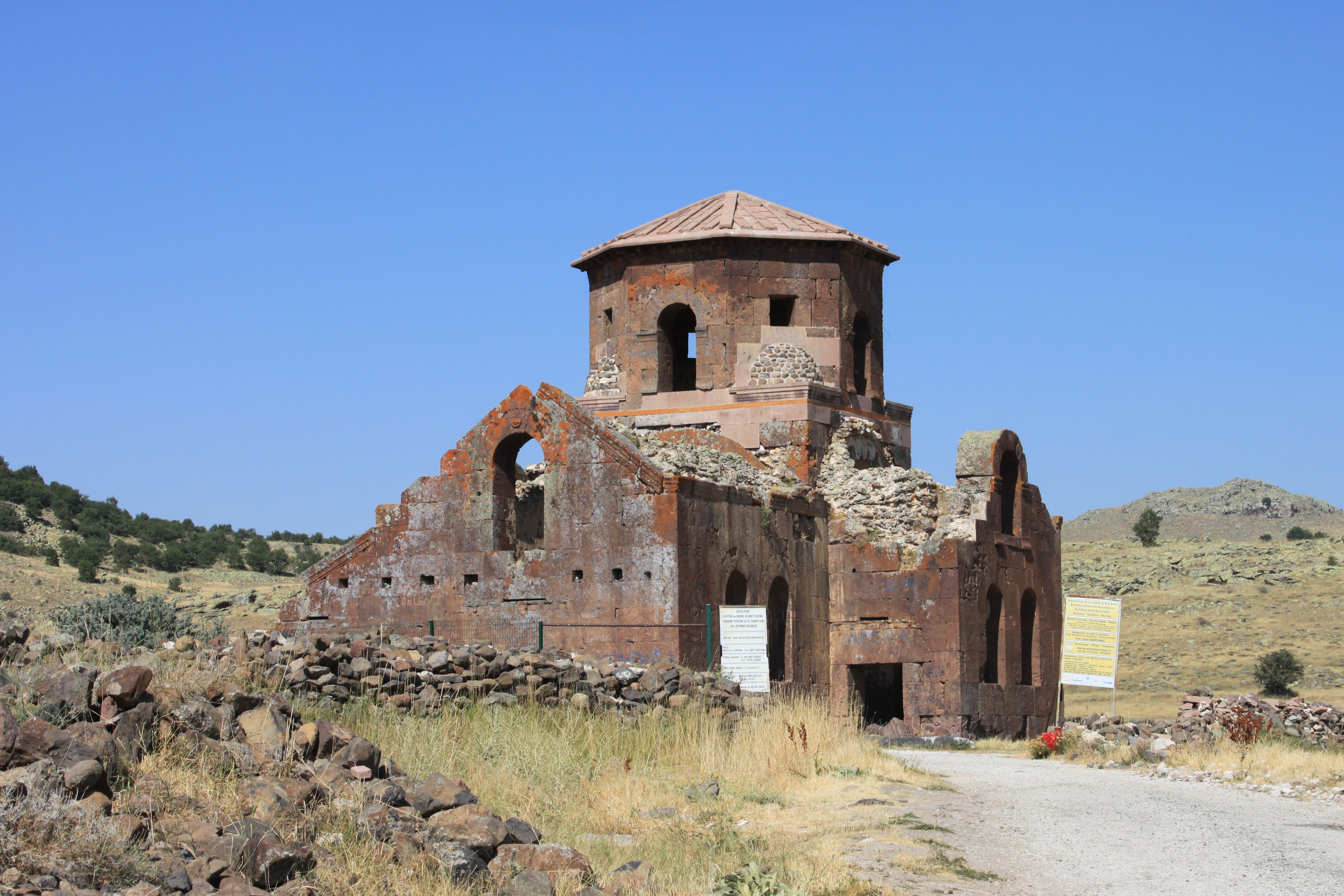
- Kızıl Kilise in Güzelyurt, Aksaray after restoration

- Location within Turkey
- 38.26°N 34.43°E
- Location: Güzelyurt, Aksaray Province
- Country: Turkey
- Denomination: Greek Orthodox

History
- Status: Church

Architecture
- Functional status: Abandoned and partially ruined
- Years built: 6th century

Specifications
- Materials: Red volcanic stone

Kızıl Kilise, the Red Church, also known as Sivrihisar Kızıl Kilise, is a partially ruined sixth-century church in the Güzelyurt district of Aksaray Province, Turkey. The church takes its name from the red stone used to build it. It was used until the Greco-Turkish population exchange in 1924 and then fell into ruins. The building has been listed in the World Monuments Watch since 2008.

== Background ==
Probably erected in the sixth century during the reign of the Byzantine Emperor Justinian I (r. 527–565), the edifice is one of the oldest Christian shrines of the Cappadocia region and one of the oldest churches known to have a cupola on a drum with windows that illuminate the interior. The church was possibly dedicated to Saint Gregory of Nazianzus, one of the fathers of the Cappadocian church. The natives called it also as Saint Panteleimon Monastery (Μοναστήριον του Αγίου Παντελεήμονος). which conflicts with existing claims of its name being Saint Spyridon.

In central and eastern Cappadocia, 5th and 6th-century churches with cross-shaped plans were standard. Kızıl Kilise follows this plan form, using local volcanic stones cut into regular blocks by highly skilled workers. Architecturally, the most characteristic element of the church is its central dome, erected above an octagonal drum. Eight windows pierce the drum, flooding the nave with light. The only later addition to the building is the narthex; otherwise the church, albeit damaged, still retains its original form. The presence of huge lintels finished off using a highly professional technique hints to a usage as an imperial or burial chapel. Pilgrims traversing Anatolia on the way to Jerusalem along an ancient route could readily reach the church.

Gertrude Bell (1868–1926), the British archaeologist and writer, photographed and measured Kızıl Kilise in 1907.

Kızıl Kilise was operational until the 1st of August 1924 by the Turkish-speaking Christians of Sivrihisar village, before they migrated to Greece with the Population Exchange.

== Reconstruction activities ==
In 2011 a program of reconstruction work began at the church. International fundraising raised €500,000 to finance the work. İsmet Ağaryılmaz, a retired professor who previously taught restoration techniques at Yıldız Technical University, directed the project.

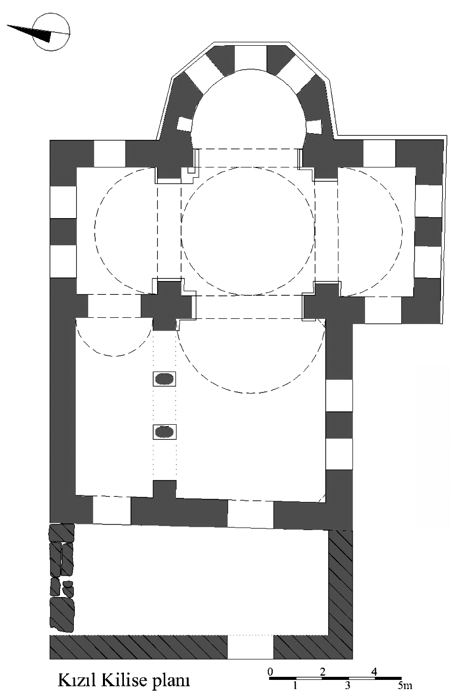
Kızıl Kilise, (St. Spyridon Church) Sivrihisar, Groundplan.

== Gallery ==
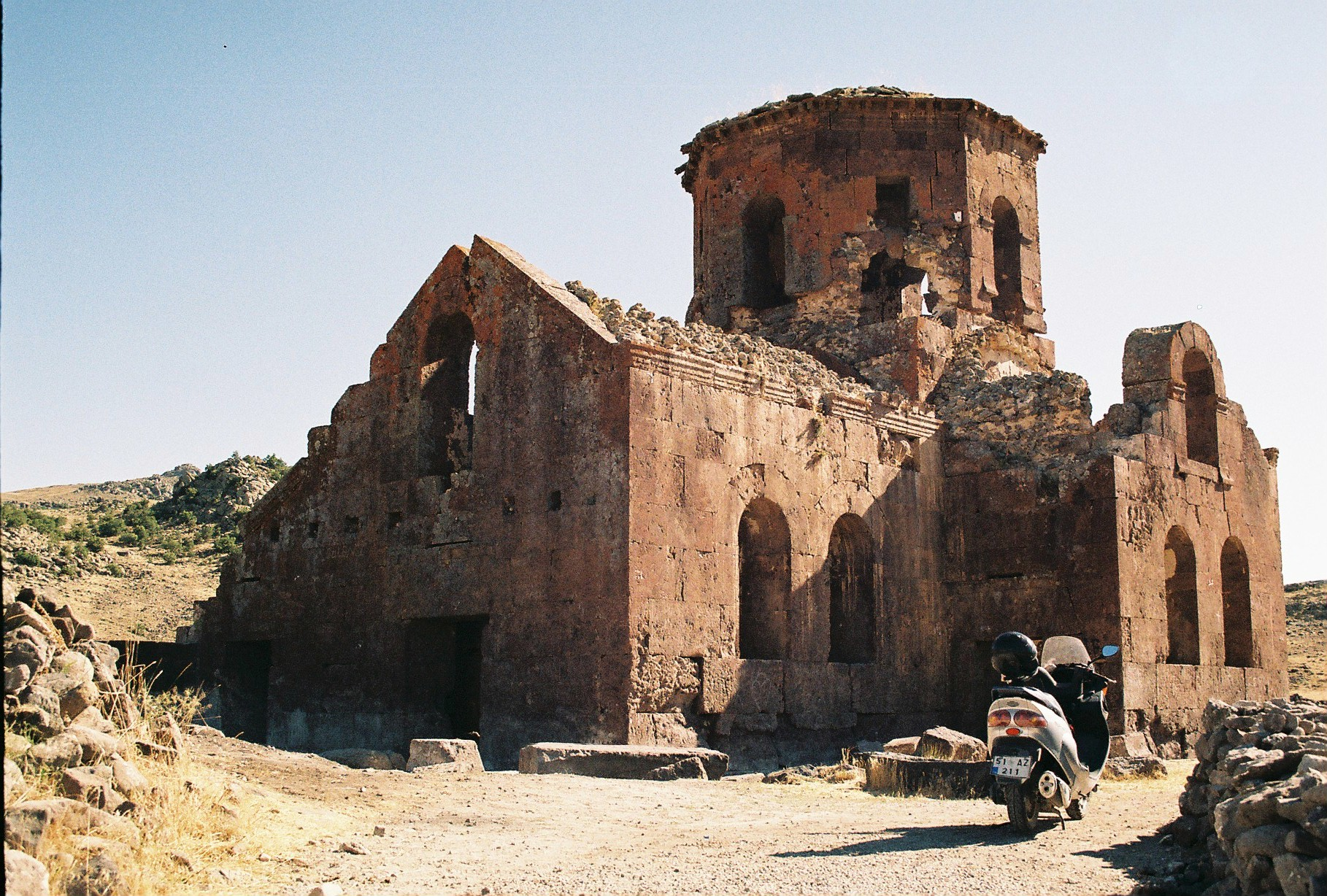
Kızıl Kilise in Güzelyurt, Aksaray before restoration

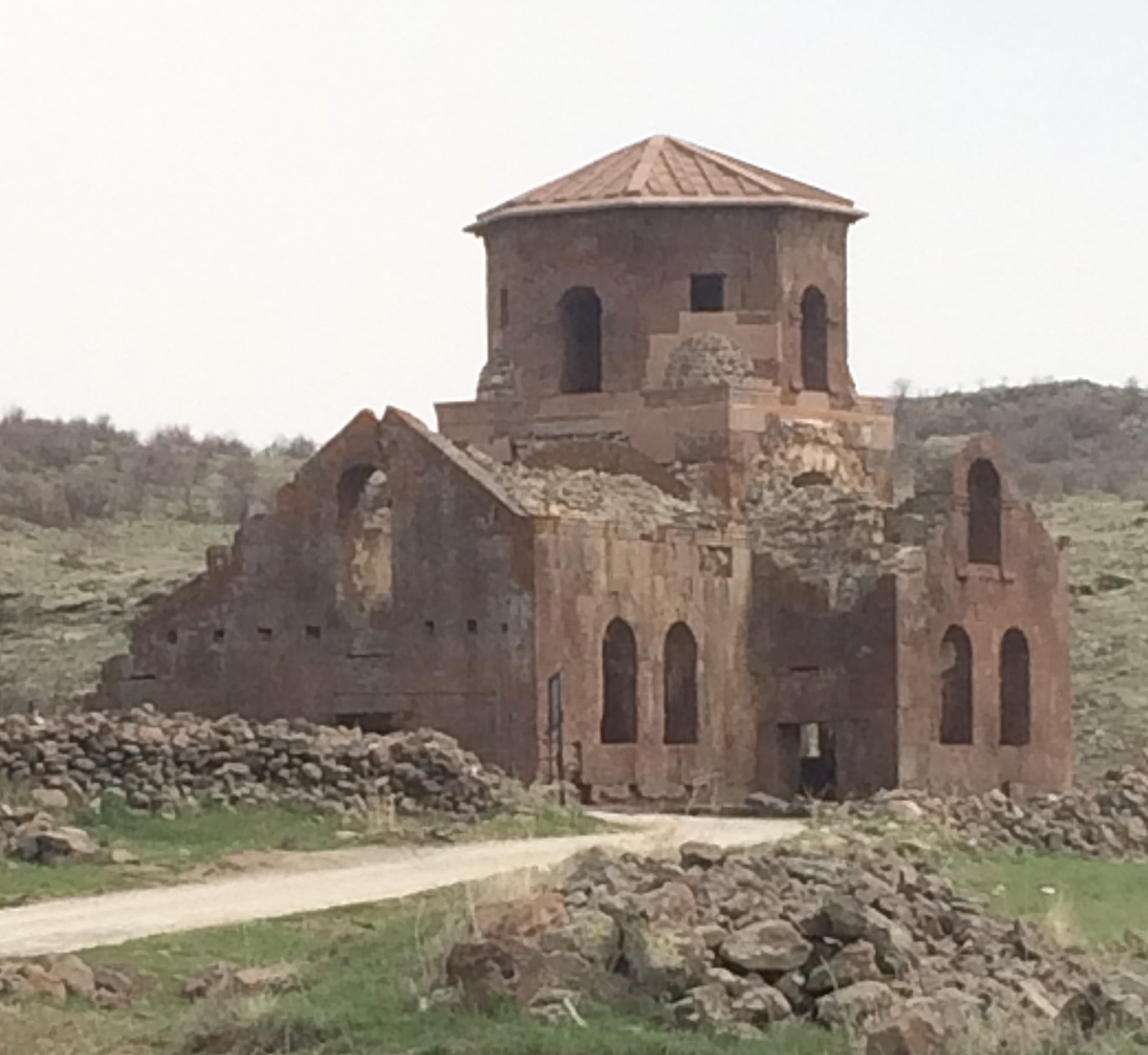
The Red Church in Cappadocia, Turkey in April 2017 following restoration in 2011.

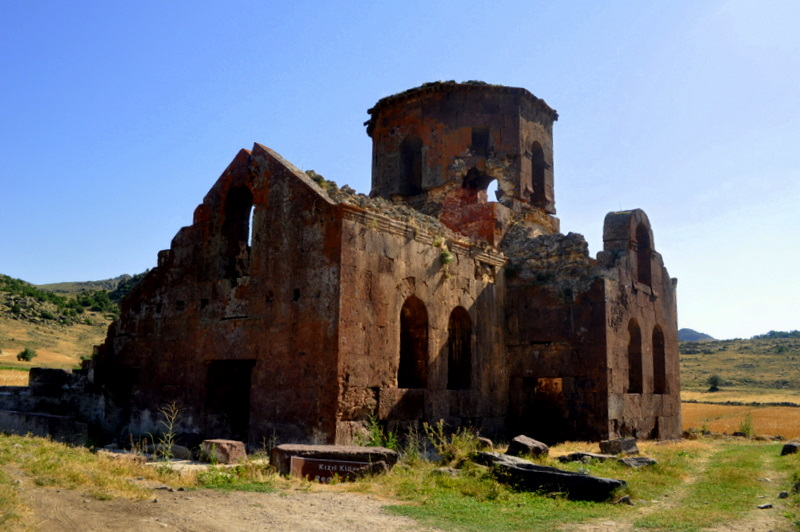
Kızıl Kilise in 2010.

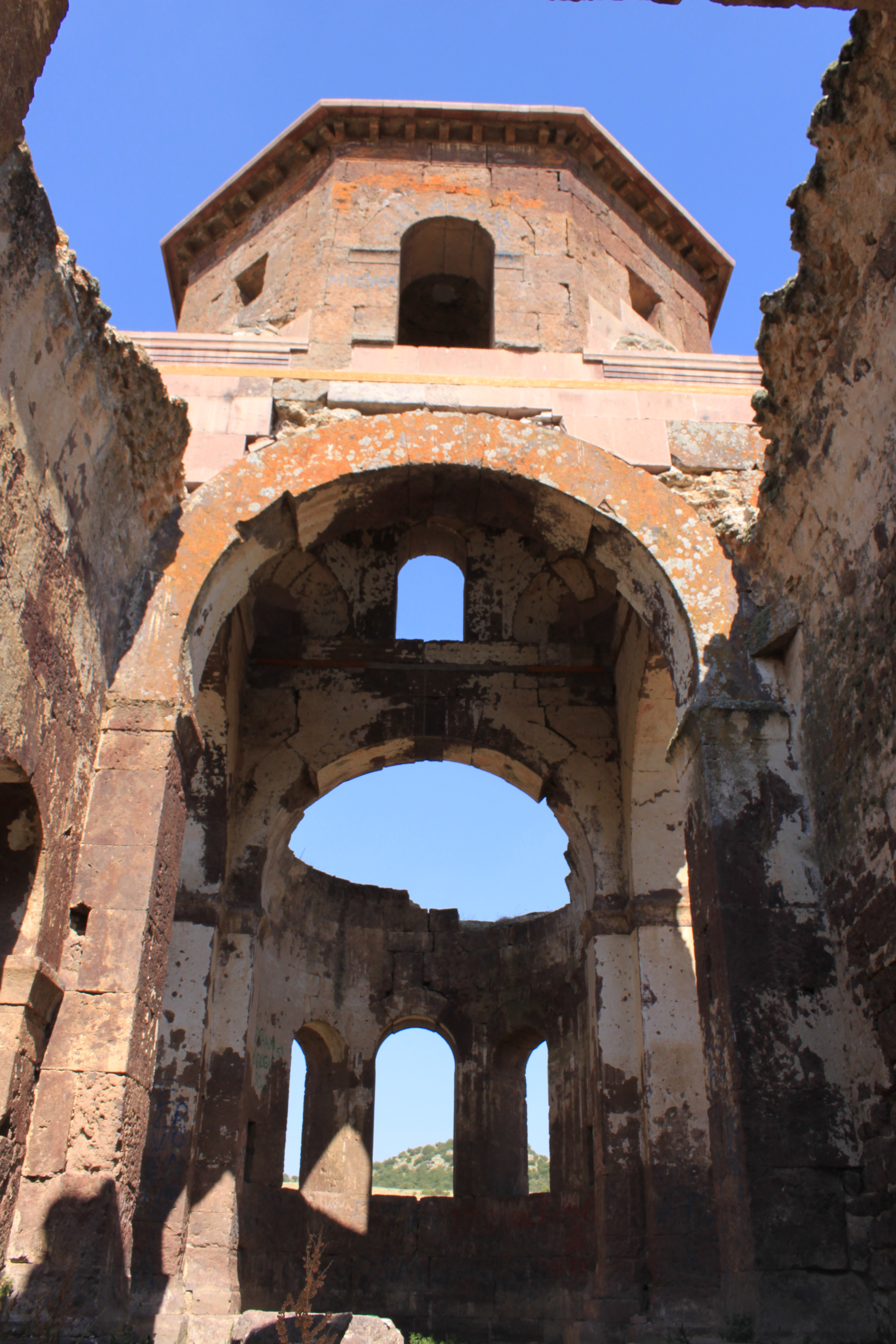
Inside the church.
