= Ouled Rahmoun =

Coordinates: 36°10′49″N 6°42′18″E

- Commune and town
- Country: Algeria
- Province: Constantine Province

Area
  - Total: 81.06 sq mi (209.95 km^{2})

Population (2008)
  - Total: 26,132
- Time zone: UTC+1 (CET)
- Postal code: 25120

Ouled Rahmoun is a town and commune in Constantine Province, Algeria. According to the 1998 census it has a population of 20,434.
