= Wassim Bouziane =

Dutch footballer (born 2006)

Personal information
- Date of birth: 22 December 2006 (age 19)
- Place of birth: Zaandam, Netherlands
- Height: 1.81 m (5 ft 11 in)
- Position: Winger

Team information
- Current team: AZ
- Number: 27

Youth career
- OFC
- 2018–2019: Fortuna Wormerveer
- 2019–2025: AZ

Senior career*
Years	Team	Apps	(Gls)
2025–2026	Jong AZ	24	(5)
2025–	AZ	4	(0)

International career^{‡}
2024	Netherlands U18	3	(1)
2024–	Netherlands U19	7	(0)
- * Club domestic league appearances and goals as of 28 April 2026 ‡ National team caps and goals as of 25 March 2025

Wassim Bouziane (born 22 December 2006) is a Dutch professional footballer who plays as a winger for Eredivisie club AZ.

== Career ==
Bouziane is a product of the youth academies of the Dutch clubs OFC, Fortuna Wormerveer and AZ Alkmaar. On 27 September 2023, he signed his first youth contract with AZ until 2026. On 2 January 2025, he signed his first professional contract with AZ until 2030, and was promoted to Jong AZ in the Eerste Divisie from their academy. On 9 November 2025, he debuted with AZ as a substitute in a 5–1 loss to PSV.

== International career ==
Born in the Netherlands, Bouziane is of Moroccan descent and holds dual Dutch and Moroccan citizenship. In March 2025, he was called up to the Netherlands U19s for a set of 2026 UEFA European Under-19 Championship qualification in March 2025.

== Personal life ==
Bouziane is the one of several brothers involved in professional or academy football; his older twin Anass plays for Volendam.

== Career statistics ==
As of match played 25 April 2026

Appearances and goals by club, season and competition
Club	Season	League			Cup		Europe		Other		Total	
Club	Season	Division	Apps	Goals	Apps	Goals	Apps	Goals	Apps	Goals	Apps	Goals
Jong AZ	2024–25	Eerste Divisie	4	1	—		—		—		4	1
Jong AZ	2025–26	Eerste Divisie	20	4	—		—		—		20	4
Jong AZ	Total		24	5	—		—		—		24	5
AZ	2025–26	Eredivisie	4	0	0	0	1 (Note: Appearances in UEFA Conference League)	0	—		5	0
AZ	2026–27	Eredivisie	0	0	0	0	0	0	—		0	0
AZ	Total		4	0	0	0	1	0	—		5	0
Career total			28	5	0	0	1	0	0	0	29	5
