= Karmravan =

Karmravan Կարմրավան
- Location within Armenia Location within Shirak
- Coordinates: 41°00′46″N 43°52′10″E
- Country: Armenia
- Province: Shirak
- Municipality: Ashotsk

Population (2011)
  - Total: 217
- Time zone: UTC+4

Karmravan (Armenian: Կարմրավան) is a village in the Ashotsk Municipality of the Shirak Province of Armenia.

== Demographics ==
Historical population
Year	Pop.	±% p.a.
1873	255	—
1897	350	+1.33%
1959	232	−0.66%
1970	237	+0.19%
1979	208	−1.44%
2001	223	+0.32%
2011	217	−0.27%
