= Courban =

- Commune
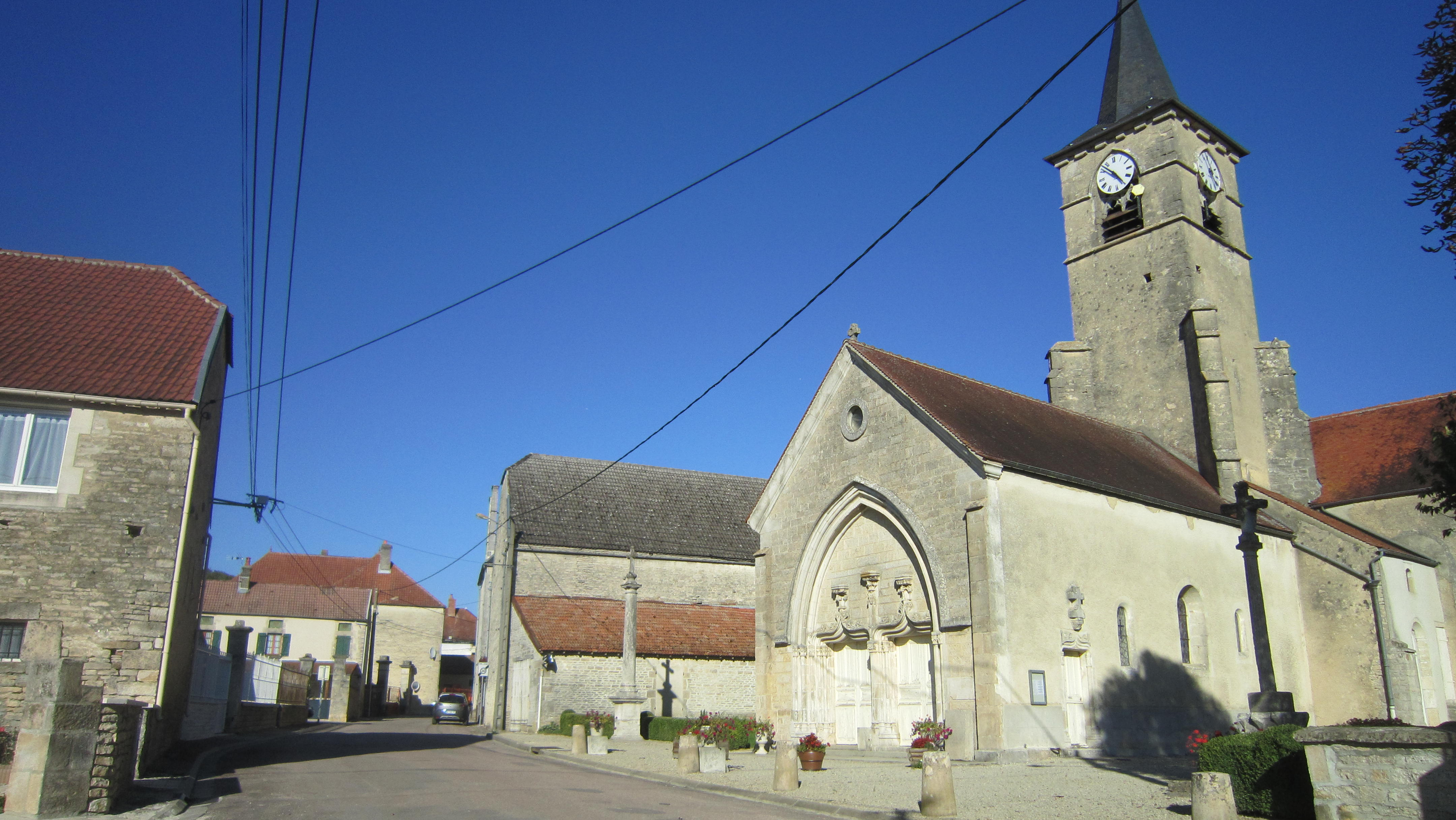
- The church and surroundings in Courban

- Coat of arms
- Location of Courban
- Location within France Location within Bourgogne-Franche-Comté
- Coordinates: 47°55′06″N 4°44′12″E
- Country: France
- Region: Bourgogne-Franche-Comté
- Department: Côte-d'Or
- Arrondissement: Montbard
- Canton: Châtillon-sur-Seine
- Intercommunality: Pays Châtillonnais

Government
  - Mayor (2020–2026): Maxime Verslype
- Area^{1}: 17.62 km^{2} (6.80 sq mi)
- Elevation: 280 m (920 ft)
- Highest elevation: 348 m (1,142 ft)
- Lowest elevation: 244 m (801 ft)
- Population (2023): 140
  - Density: 7.9/km^{2} (21/sq mi)
- Time zone: UTC+01:00 (CET)
  - Summer (DST): UTC+02:00 (CEST)
- INSEE/Postal code: 21202 /21520
- ^{1} French Land Register data, which excludes lakes, ponds, glaciers > 1 km^{2} (0.386 sq mi or 247 acres) and river estuaries.

Courban (French pronunciation: [kuʁbɑ̃]) is a commune in the Côte-d'Or department in eastern France.

== Population ==
Historical population
Year	Pop.	±% p.a.
1968	213	—
1975	201	−0.82%
1982	195	−0.43%
1990	142	−3.89%
1999	147	+0.39%
2007	163	+1.30%
2012	169	+0.73%
2017	168	−0.12%
2023	140	−2.99%
Source: INSEE

== See also ==
- Communes of the Côte-d'Or department
