= Zighoud Youcef (commune) =

Coordinates: 36°32′N 6°43′E

- Commune and town
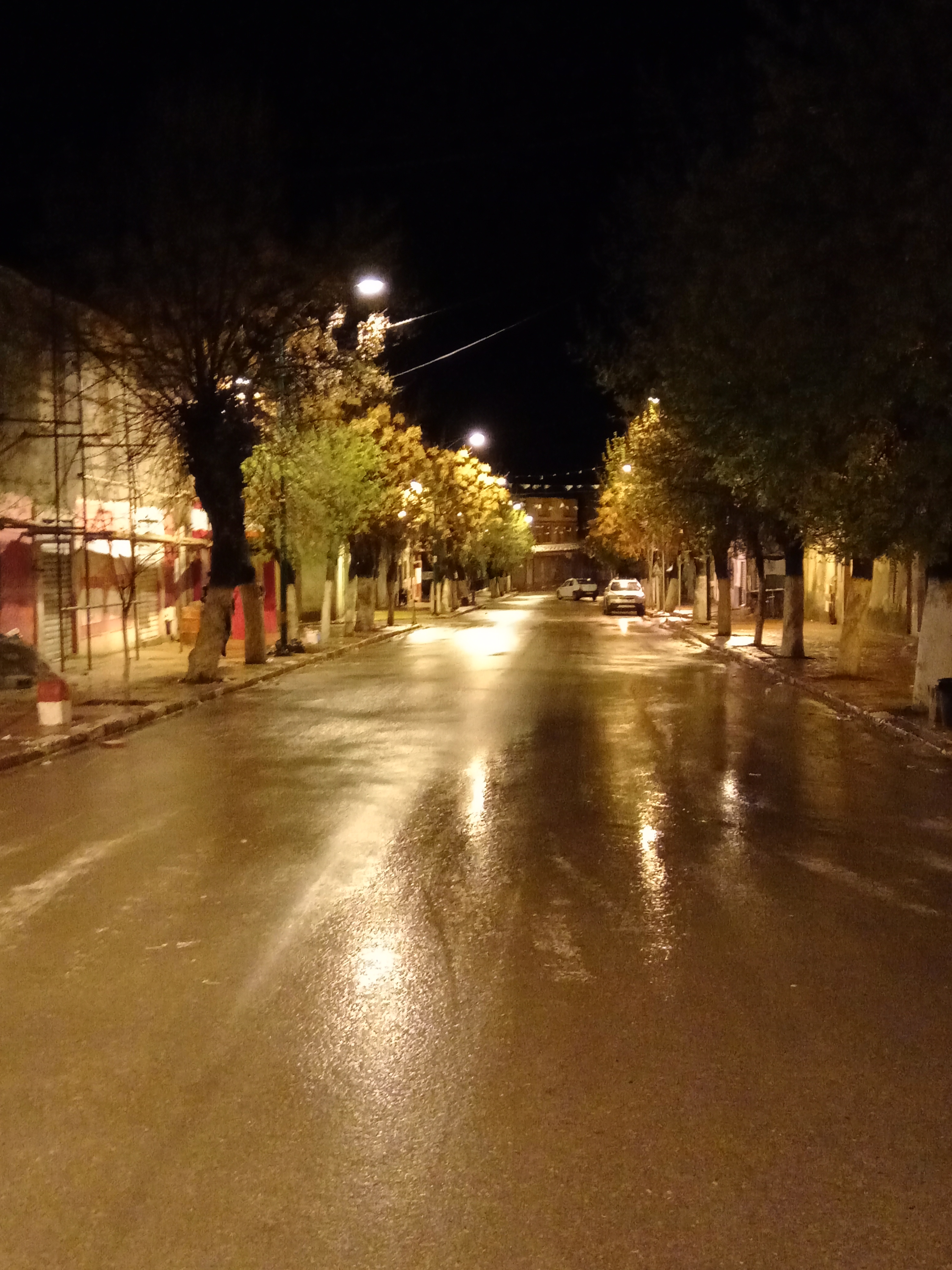
- Interactive map of Zighoud Youcef
- Country: Algeria
- Province: Constantine Province

Population (2008)
  - Total: 28,764
- Time zone: UTC+1 (CET)

Zighoud Youcef (Arabic: زيغود يوسف) is a town and commune in Constantine Province, Algeria. According to the 2008 census it has a population of 28,764. The town was formerly known as Smendou, and was renamed to its current name in honor of Youcef Zighoud, a guerrilla leader who was killed fighting for Algerian independence against the French.

== Notable people ==
- Djamel Mesbah – Algerian international footballer who played at the 2010 FIFA World Cup
- Kateb Yacine - Algerian writer
- Youcef Zighoud - Algerian colonel
