= Ibn Ziad =

Coordinates: 36°23′N 6°28′E

- Commune and town
- Interactive map of Ibn Ziad
- Country: Algeria
- Province: Constantine Province

Population (1998)
  - Total: 15,514
- Time zone: UTC+1 (CET)

Ibn Ziad is a town and commune in Constantine Province, Algeria. According to the 1998 census it has a population of 15,514.
