= Didouche Mourad =

Coordinates: 36°27′N 6°38′E

- Commune and town
- Interactive map of Didouche Mourad
- Country: Algeria
- Province: Constantine Province

Population (1998)
  - Total: 33,266
- Time zone: UTC+1 (CET)

Didouche Mourad is a town and commune in Constantine Province, Algeria. According to the 1998 census it has a population of 33,266.
