= Hamma Bouziane (town) =

Coordinates: 36°32′N 6°43′E

- Commune and town
- Interactive map of Hamma Bouziane
- Country: Algeria
- Province: Constantine Province

Population (2008 Census)
  - Total: 83,603
- Time zone: UTC+1 (CET)

Hamma Bouziane is a town and commune in Constantine Province, Algeria. According to the 2008 census it has a population of 83.603.
