= Constantine Province =

Province of Algeria

Constantine Province ولاية قسنطينة
- Province
- Nickname: City Of Bridges
- Map of Algeria highlighting Constantine

- Map of the 6 districts of Constantine
- Coordinates: 36°21′N 6°36′E
- Country: Algeria
- Capital: Constantine

Government
  - PPA president: A.Chibane

Area
  - Total: 2,187 km^{2} (844 sq mi)

Population (2019)
  - Total: 1,012,643
  - Density: 463.0/km^{2} (1,199/sq mi)
- Demonym: Constantinian
- Time zone: UTC+01 (CET)
- Area Code: +213 (0) 31
- ISO 3166 code: DZ-25
- Districts: 6
- Municipalities: 12

Constantine (Arabic: ولاية قسنطينة) is one of the 58 provinces (wilayas) of Algeria, whose capital is the city of the same name, with 969,934 inhabitants, with a density of 424/km^{2} (1,908/sq mi).

== History ==
In 1984 Mila Province was carved out of its territory.

== Administrative divisions ==
The province is divided into 6 districts or daïra, which are subdivided into 12 communes or municipalities.

== List of districts ==
District	Number of municipalities	Municipalities	Area (km^{2})	Population (hab.)
Constantine	1	Constantine	231.63	462,374
El Khroub	3	El Khroub • Aïn Smara • Ouled Rahmoune	610.70	248,160
Aïn Abid	2	Aïn Abid • Ibn Badis	634.22	51,478
Zighoud Youcef	2	Zighoud Youcef • Beni Hamiden	367.97	48,432
Hamma Bouziane	2	Hamma Bouziane • Didouche Mourad	186.88	128,867
Ibn Ziad	2	Ibn Ziad • Messaoud Boudjeriou	257.37	30,623
