= Ihlara =

- Municipality
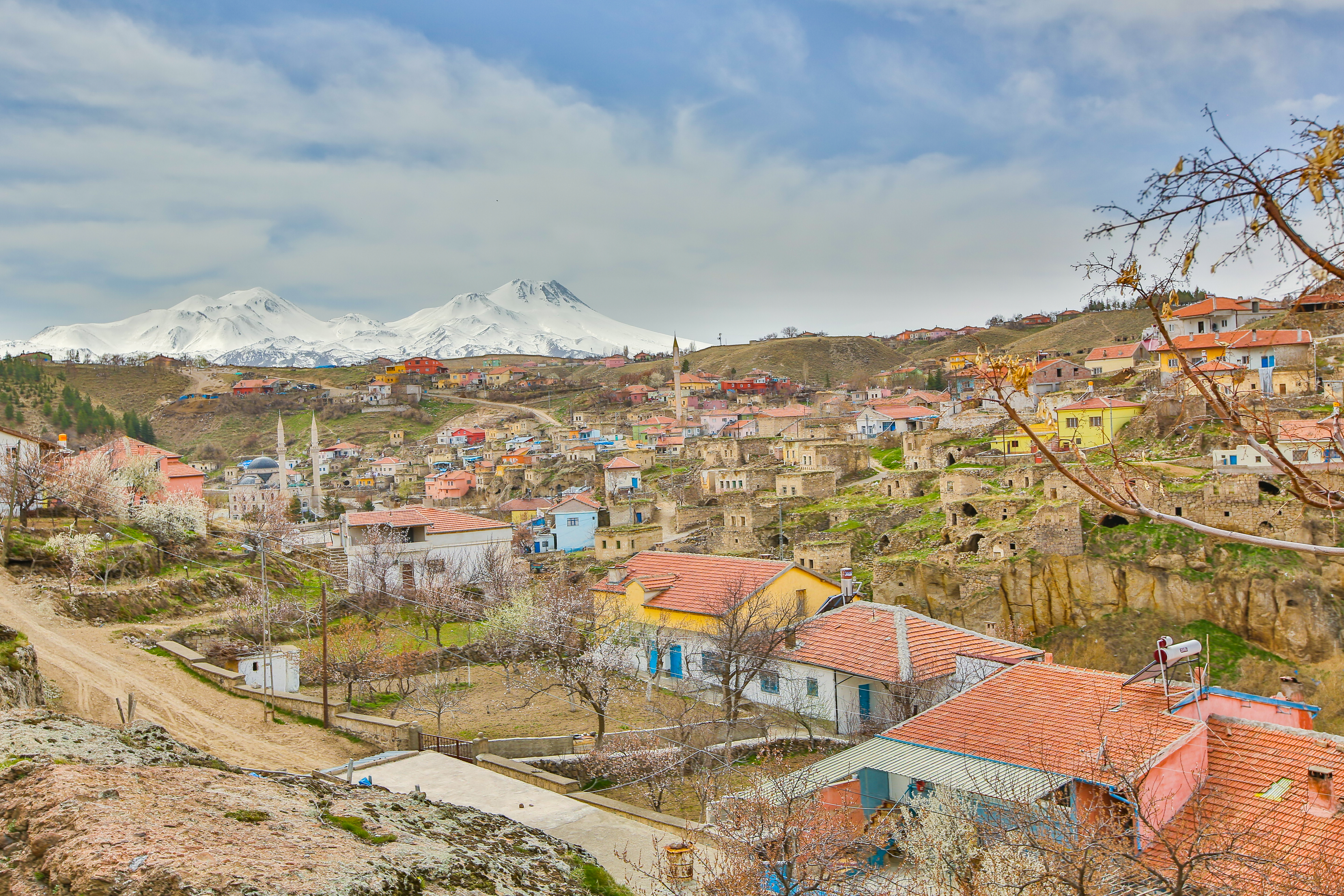
- The town of Ihlara

- Location within Turkey Location within Turkey Central Anatolia
- Coordinates: 38°14′N 34°18′E
- Country: Turkey
- Province: Aksaray
- District: Güzelyurt
- Population (2021): 2,289
- Time zone: UTC+3 (TRT)
- Area code: 0382
- Website: www.ihlara.bel.tr

Ihlara, formerly known as Chliára (Cappadocian Greek: Χλιάρα; Latin: Chliará) is a town (belde) and municipality in the Güzelyurt District, Aksaray Province, Turkey. The population is 2,289 (2021). It is situated at about 40 km (25 mi) from the province seat of Aksaray and near the town of Güzelyurt. The township is famed for the nearby valley of the same name, Ihlara Valley, which is a 16 km (10 mi) long gorge cut into volcanic rock in the southern part of Cappadocia, following several eruptions of Mount Erciyes. The Melendiz River flows through the valley.

The Ihlara valley consists of 14 km along the north-south Melendiz River, which runs from Selime to Ihlara village. Sixteen of the valley's 105 churches are open to visitors, and most of these are within 1 km of the official valley entrance in Ihlara. The first one you are likely to see is Ağaçaltı Kilise (Church Under the Trees), at the base of the stairs leading into the valley. Spectacular blue and white angels encircle the Christ figure on the well-preserved dome. Another 30m south past the Ağaçaltı (to the right after descending the entrance stairs, away from Belisirma) lies the Ptirenllseki Church, whose faded walls enclose the many martyrs of Sivas. The Kokar Kilise (Odorous Church), 70m farther along, celebrates biblical stories with colorful frescoes and ornate geometrical ceiling crosses.

What makes the valley unique is the ancient history of its inhabitants. The whole canyon is honeycombed with rock-cut underground dwellings and churches from the Byzantine period built by the Cappadocian Greeks. These local people were forced to leave the area and move to Greece in the 1923 Population exchange between Turkey and Greece.

== Etymology ==
The town of Ihlara had formerly been known as Chlorus or Chlorós (Ancient Greek: Χλωρός) during the Roman and Byzantine period. This name was later rendered as Chliara (Cappadocian Greek: Χλιάρα; Latin: Chliará), which later got mutated to Ichlara, and then to its present name, Ihlara.

== Features ==
It is 40 km from Aksaray.

Ihlara Valley is a canyon valley formed as a result of stream erosion by lava sprayed from Hasandağı volcano. Melendiz Stream, at the end of a process of millions of years, created this canyon-like valley that is 14 kilometers long and reaches 110 meters in height. The Melendiz Stream, which led the canyon through these cracks to take its current form, was called "Potamus Kapadukus", which means Cappadocia River in ancient times.

The 14 km long valley starts from Ihlara and ends in Selime. Melendiz Stream meanders through the canyon. The length of the stream, which makes more than 26 meanders between Ihlara and Selime, is 8 km, but in reality it reaches 13 km. The height of the valley is 100 –150 m in places. There are countless shelters, tombs and churches carved into the rocks throughout the valley. The decorations in the churches in the Ihlara Valley started in the 6th century and continued until the end of the 13th century.

Some shelters and churches are connected by tunnels, as in underground cities.
