= Sivrihisar, Güzelyurt =

Sivrihisar
- Village
- Location within Turkey Location within Turkey Central Anatolia
- Coordinates: 38.2635°N 34.4134°E
- Country: Turkey
- Province: Aksaray
- District: Güzelyurt
- Population (2022): 138
- Time zone: UTC+3 (TRT)

Sivrihisar is a village in the Güzelyurt District, Aksaray Province, Turkey. Its population is 138 (2022).

== History ==
Its name was likely Arianzus, or Arianzum in antiquity due to its proximity to the settlement, though this is not confirmed. The village has had the same name since 1919.

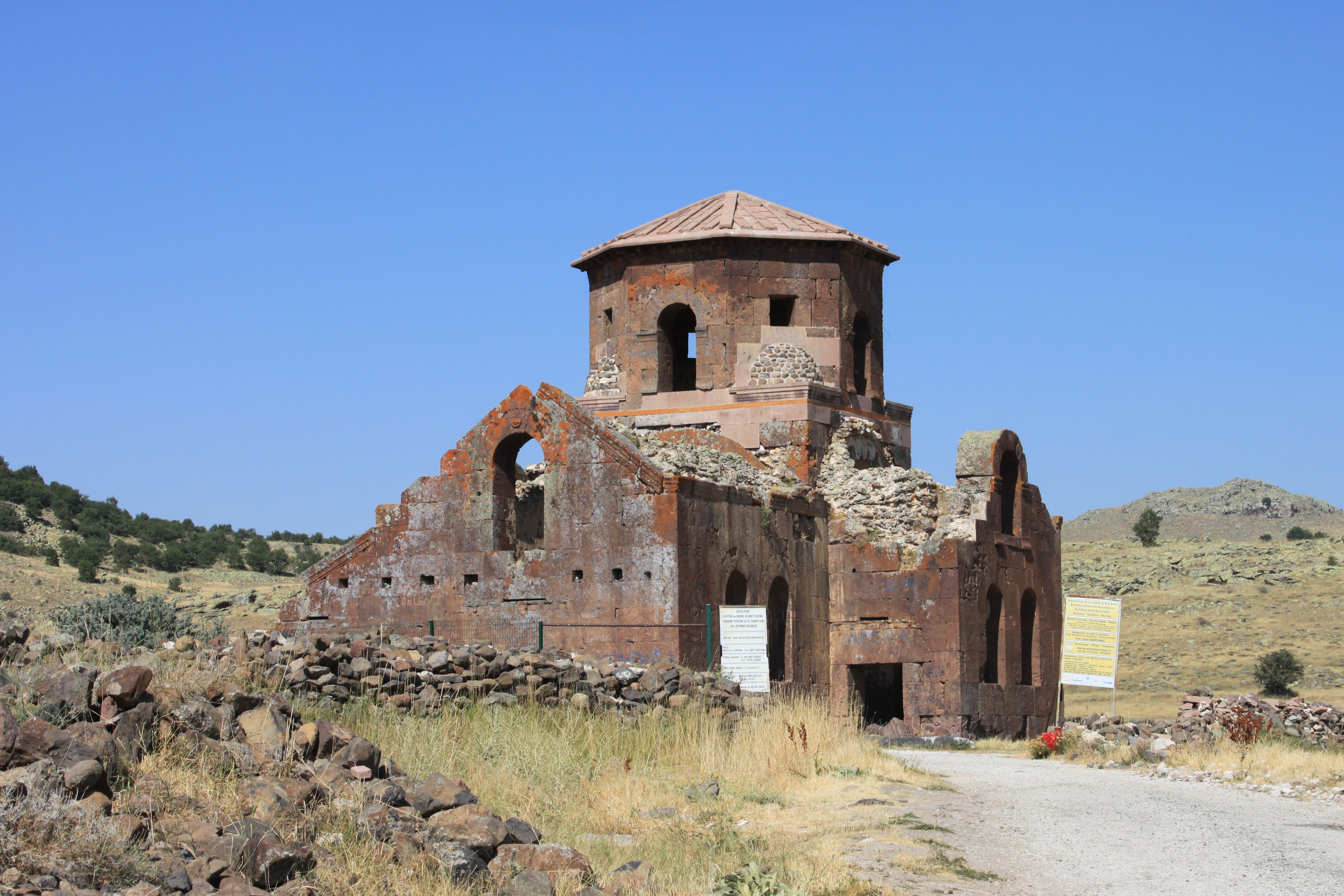
the Kizil Kilise is an important monument of not only Sivrihisar, but the Aksaray Province as a whole.

== Geography ==
It is 51 km from Aksaray city center and 5 km from Güzelyurt town center.

== Population ==
Historical population
Year	Pop.	±% p.a.
2007	127	—
2012	135	+1.23%
2017	137	+0.29%
2022	138	+0.15%
Source: TÜIK (2007-2022)
