= Alanyurt =

Alanyurt (literally "field homeland") is a Turkish place name that may refer to the following places in Turkey:

- Alanyurt, Güzelyurt, a village in the district of Güzelyurt, Aksaray Province
- Alanyurt, İscehisar, a village in the district of İscehisar, Afyonkarahisar Province
- Alanyurt, Kale
