= Ihlara valley =

Valley in Aksaray Province, Turkey

Ihlara Valley
- Peristrema-Tal
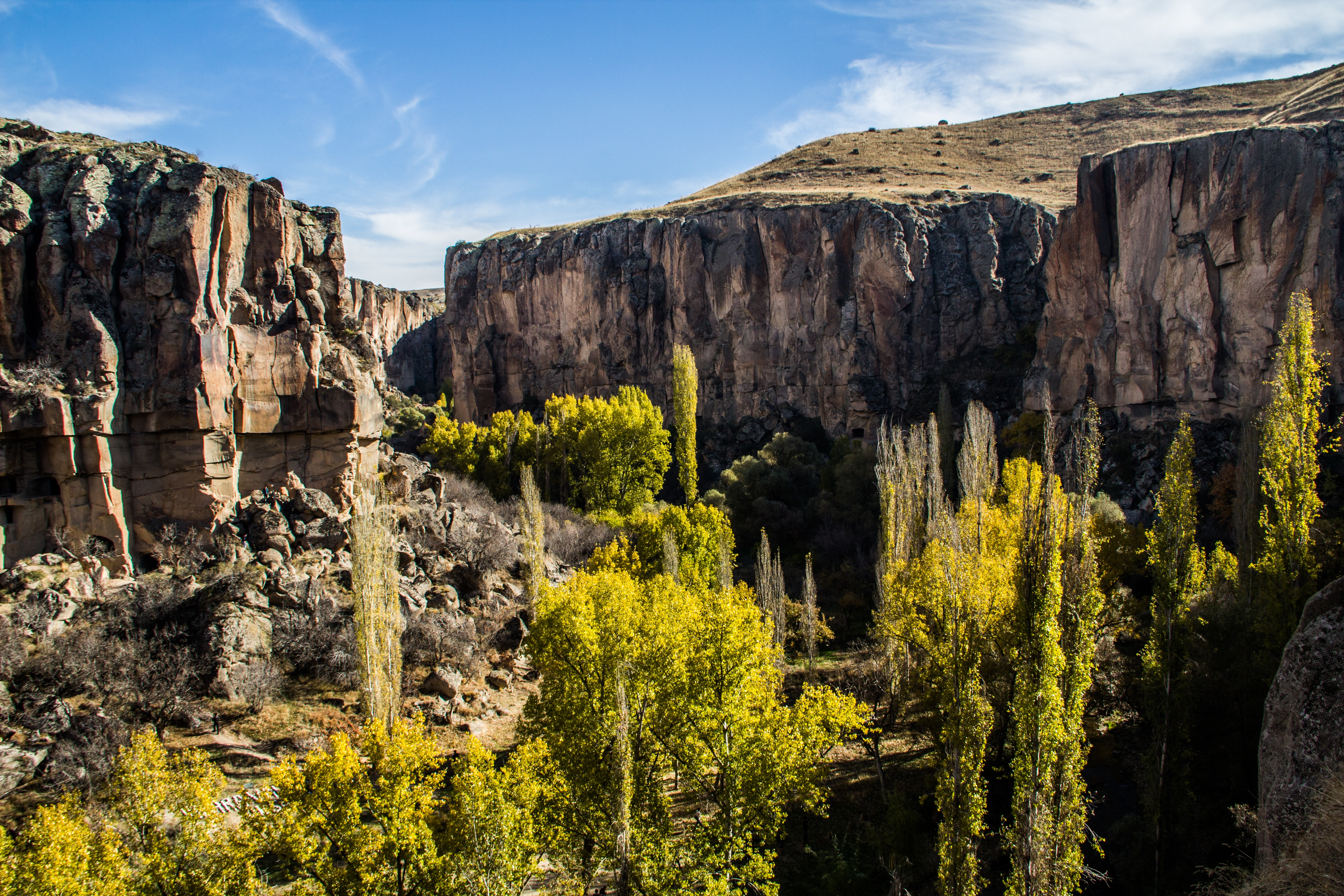
- View of Ihlara Valley

- Location within Turkey
- Length: 15 km (9.3 mi)

Geography
- Location: İlçe Güzelyurt, Aksaray Province (Turkey)
- State/Province: Cappadocia
- Coordinates: 38°15′40″N 34°17′32″E
- Interactive map of Ihlara Valley

The Ihlara Valley (or Peristrema Valley; Turkish Ihlara Vadisi) is a canyon which is 15 km long and up to 150 m deep in the southwest of the Turkish region of Cappadocia, in the municipality of Güzelyurt, Aksaray Province. The valley contains around 50 rock-hewn Christian churches and numerous rock-cut buildings.

== Etymology ==
The earlier Greek name, Peristrema (Περιστρημα; winding round) of the village of Belisarma which is located about halfway along the valley from Ihlara to Selime, gave its name to the valley as well.

== Development and location ==
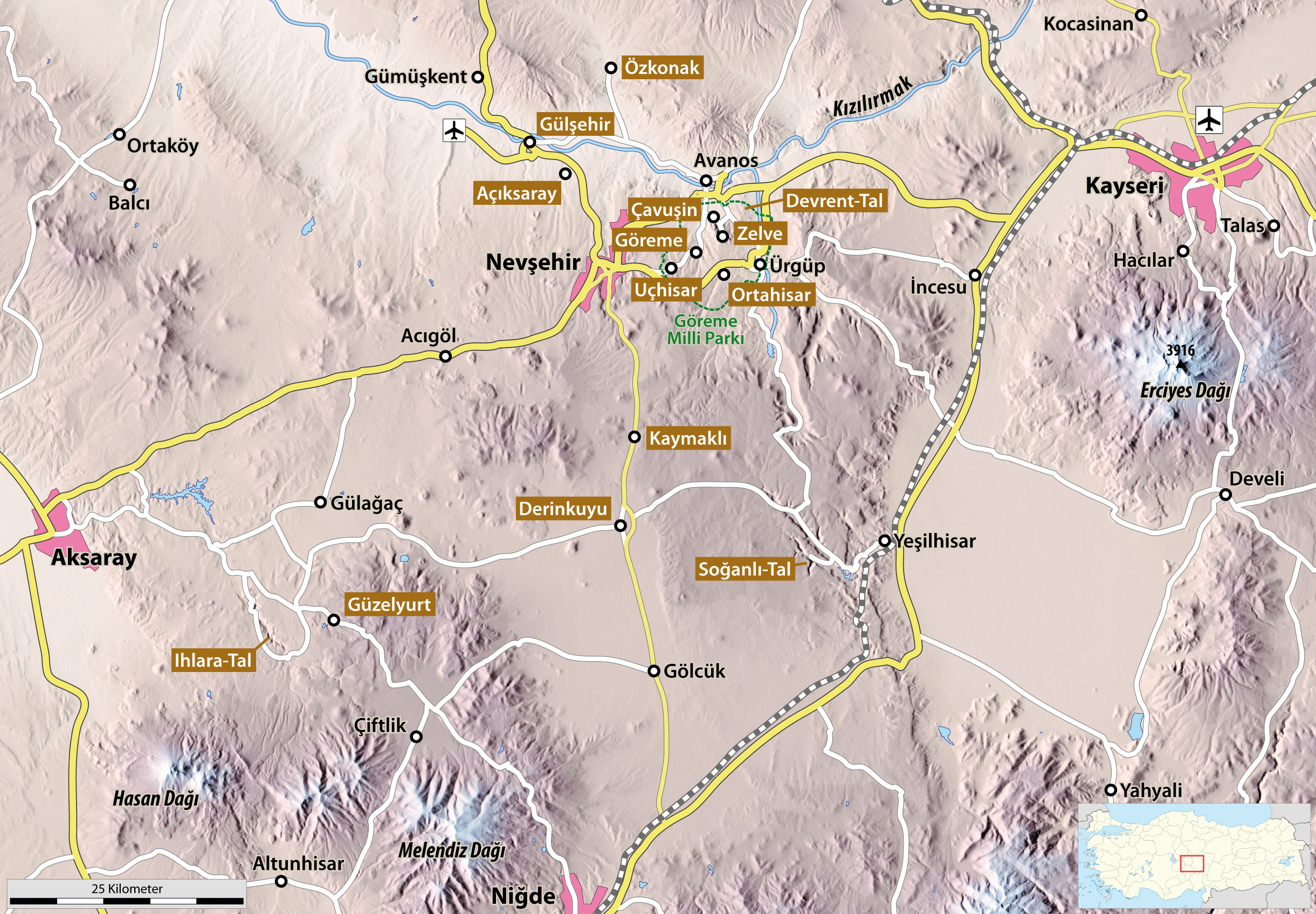
The Ihlara Valley and other noteworthy sites in Cappadocia

The canyon was formed in prehistoric times by the Melendiz River. It lies between the villages of Ihlara in the southeast and Selime in the northwest. At the north end of the village of Ihlara, there is a stairway with almost 400 steps, which descends over 100 m down into the canyon. From the 7th century AD, the valley was settled by Byzantine monks who dug their houses and churches out of the tuff stone, which had been deposited by the eruptions of Mount Hasan.

== Churches ==
The Christian churches in the valley fall into two groups. The first consists of the churches near the village of Ihlara, which are decorated with paintings of a local Cappadocian type that show influence from Persia and Syria to the east. They mostly pre-date the Iconoclasm, but were often repainted in newer styles over time. The second group is located near the village of Belisarma and consists of churches in the Byzantine style of the tenth and eleventh centuries, known as Macedonian art.

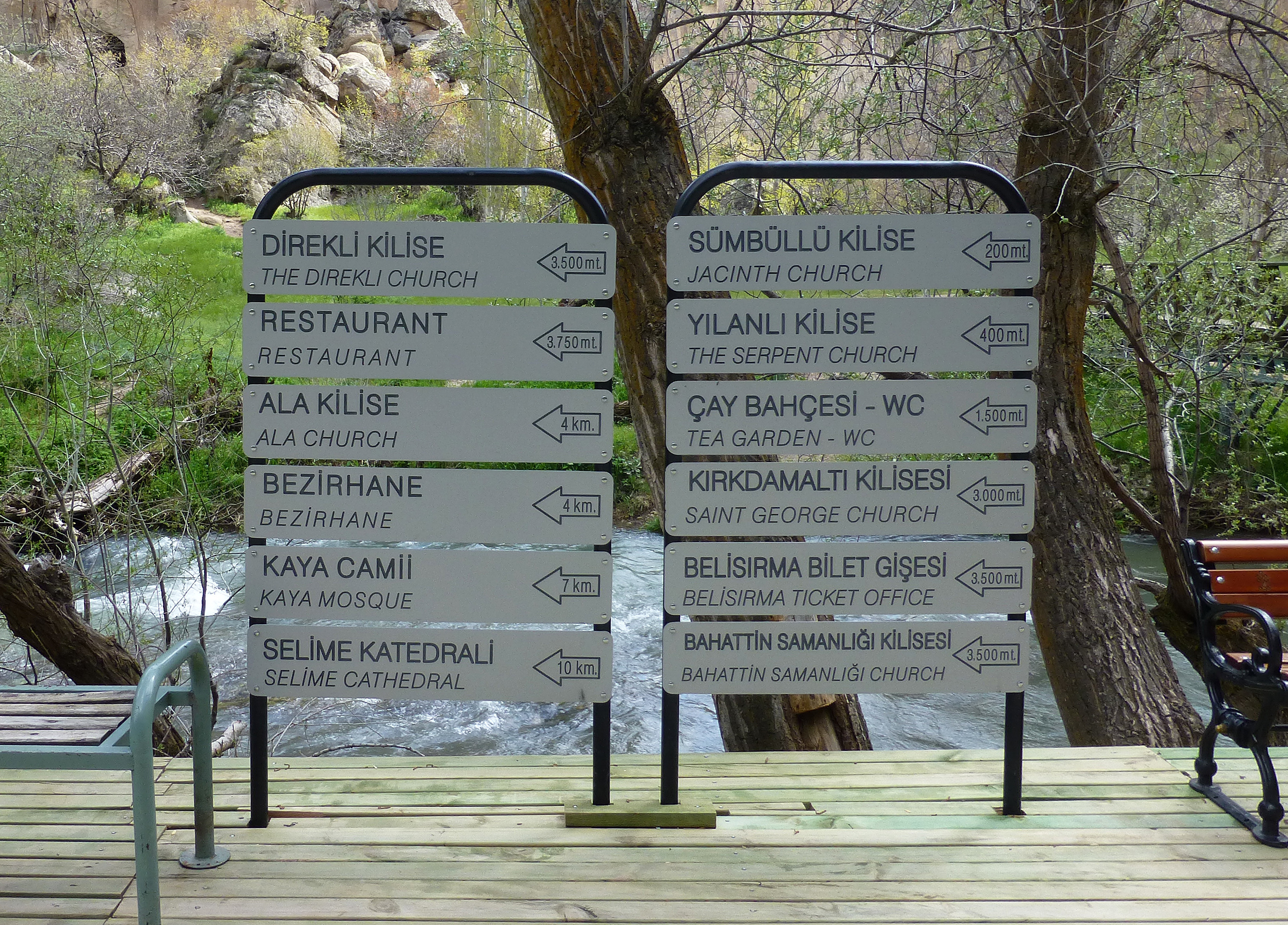
Churches of Ihlara

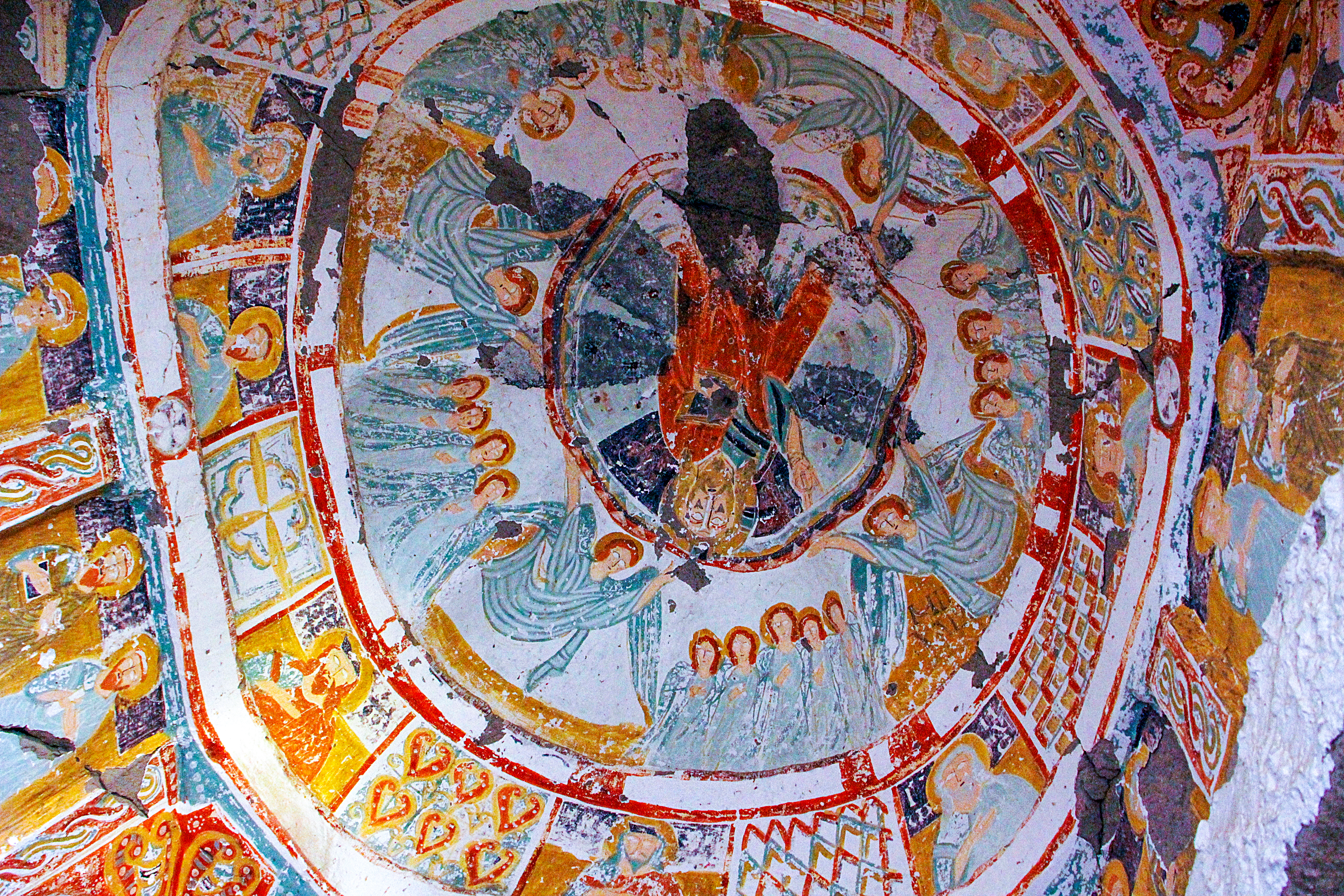
Ceiling fresco in Daniel Pantonassa Church, Ihlara Valley.

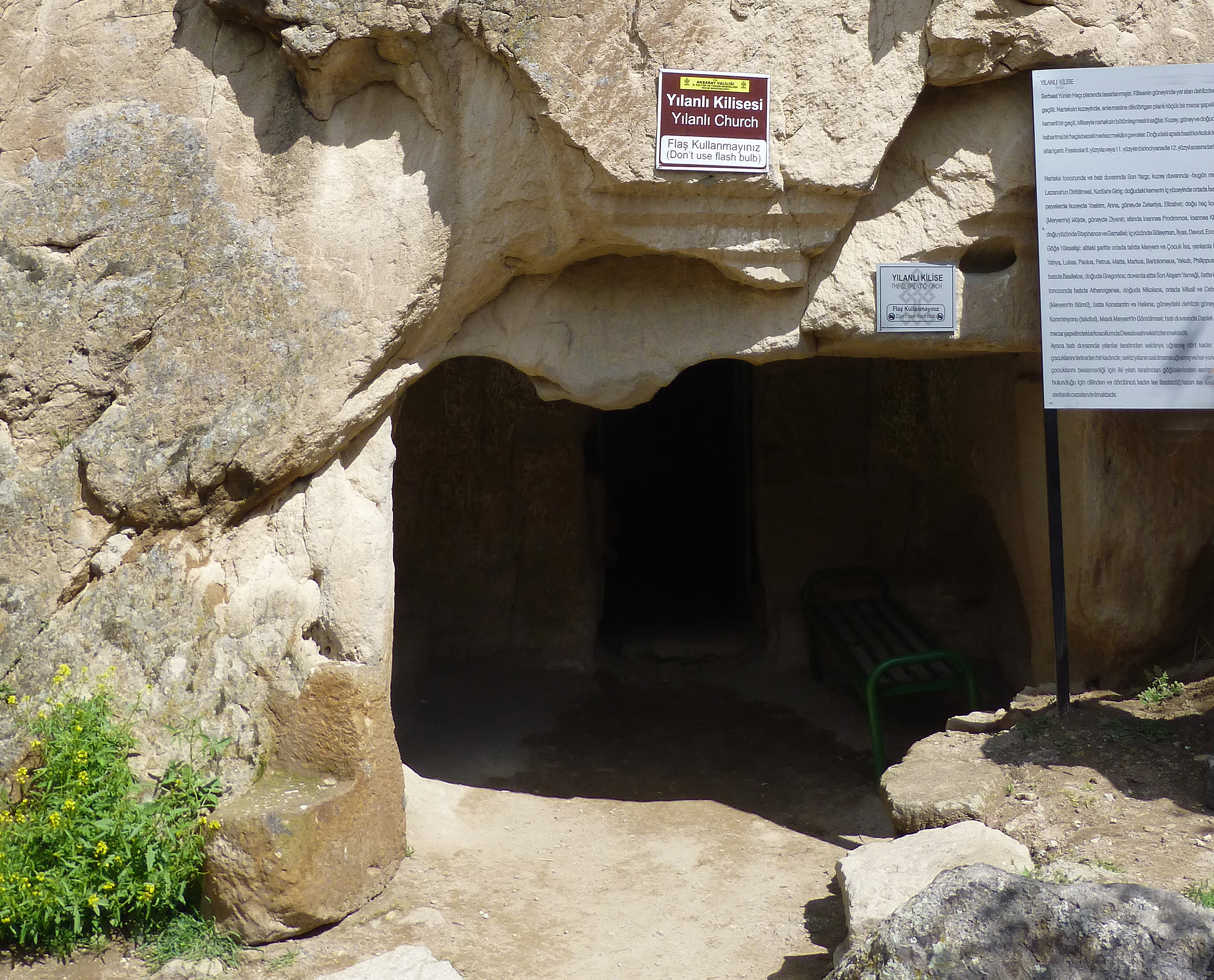
the Church of the Serpent, in the Ihlara Valley (Cappadocia, Turkey).

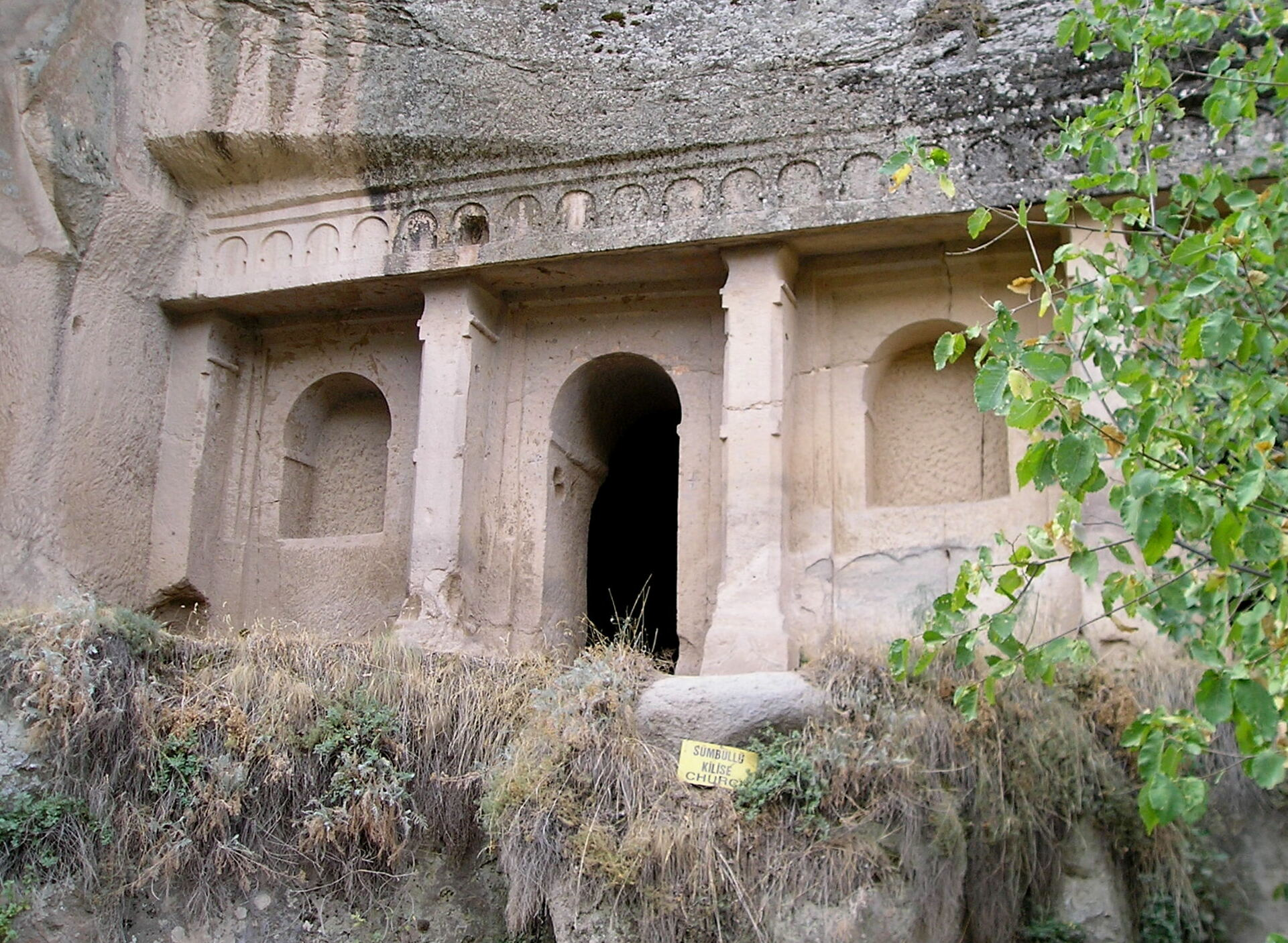
Sümbüllü (Hyacinth) Church

The first group includes:

- Ağaçaltı Kilisesi ('Church under the Tree'): also known as "Daniel Pantonassa Church", in dedication to Daniel the Stylite, a cross-in-square church cut out of the cliff, perhaps dating to the 7th century AD. The depiction of the Ascension in its cupola pre-dates the Iconoclasm.
- Yılanlı Kilise ('Snake Church'): also known as "Apocalypse Church", possibly dedicated to Helena Augusta, the mother of Constantine I, another cross-in-square church with an unusually long apse. In the narthex there are scenes of Hell dating to the 9th century AD, and below them are four naked sinners in the grip of snake-like monsters - from which the church takes its modern name.
- Sümbüllü Kilise ('Hyacinth church'): also known as "Jacinth Church" possibly from the 10th century AD. The church has a T-shaped ground plan and belongs to the transition to the Macedonian style. The wall paintings include depictions of Constantine VII with his wife Helena, as well as frescos of Paul the Apostle. On the other hand, the external facade shows eastern influences.
- Kokar Kilise, also known as 'Church of Andrew in Cynocephalia', in dedication to Andrew the Apostle.
- Eğritaş Kilisesi ('Curved Stone Church'): possibly dedicated to Nikolaos Oikonomides and formerly known as (N. Oikonomidès), It is thought that Eğritaş Church was built before the Iconoclast (726–843) and is one of the early and large churches of the valley.
- Pürenli Seki Church: ('Pine Needle Terrace'), with frescos of the Holy Apostles including Nikephoros Ouranos at the Crucifixion, The church consists of four halls carved into the rock. Other frescos include a donkey being led by James, Christ's half-brother, and Sts. George and Theodore on horses being directed towards the center where a cross above the remnants of two serpents’ heads lies between the two saints. The frescos are dated to the second half of the 9th century and the second half of the 11th century.
- Karanlık Kale Kilisesi ('Dark Castle Church'): It was carved into the rock as a monastery church. 9-10 of the church, which has no frescoes. It is estimated to have been built in the middle of the 11th century.

The second group includes:

- Direkli Kilise ('Pillar church'). The cruciform nave church was created in the 10th century AD. The cupola is supported by four tall columns, which are decorated with portraits of saints. One of the few inscriptions in the valley reports the dedication of the church by the Byzantine emperor Basil II (r. 976-1025).
- Karagedik Kilisesi ('Church with the Black Gap', also called 'St. Ermolaos Church'). a cross-in-square church with four pillars, which was built from bricks and trachyte blocks in the 11th century and has been almost entirely destroyed aside from some faded remains of paintings.

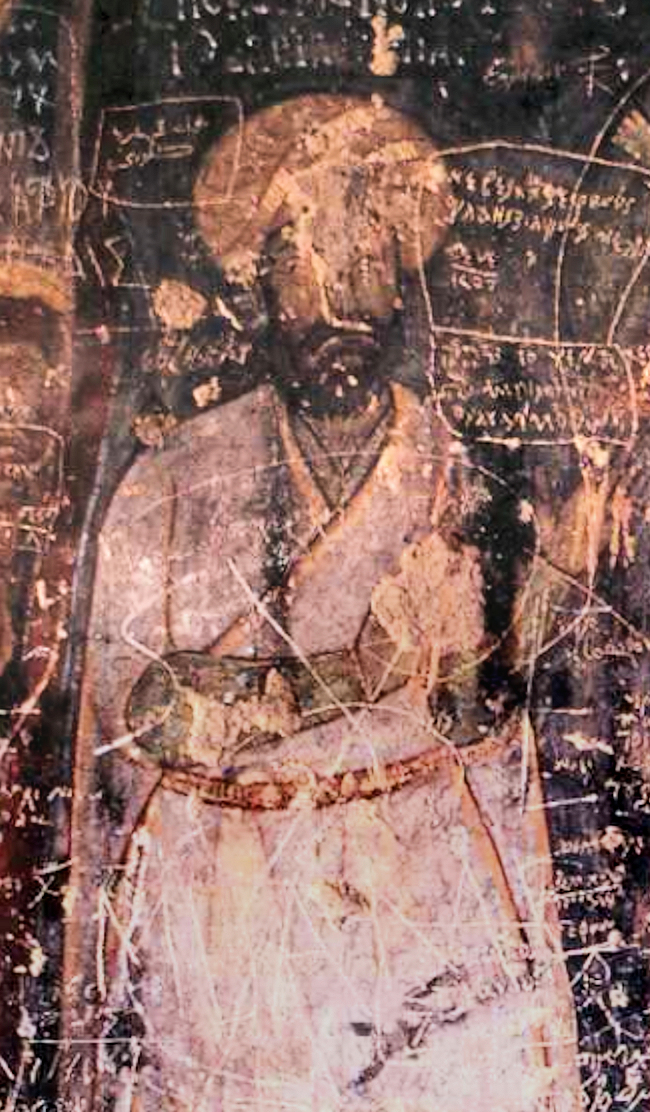
The Byzantine consul Basil Giakoupes in Kırkdamaltı Kilisesi

- Kırkdamaltı Kilisesi ('Church with forty roofs', also called 'St. George's Church'). An inscription allows the church to be dated between 1283 and 1295, which makes it the last known example of Christian architecture in the Ihlara valley until the revival of church building by the Cappadocian Greeks in the 19th century. The church's paintings include depictions of St. George, a painting of the Byzantine consul Basileos Giagupes, who was also an Emir and is shown in Seljuk clothing with his wife Thamar, a Georgian princess. The aforementioned inscription mentions both the Seljuk Sultan Mesud II and the Byzantine emperor Andronikos II Palaiologos, a sign that at this date some kind of peaceful co-existence between Christians and Muslims was possible in Cappadocia.
- Bahattin Samanlığı Kilise, named after the person who used this church as a barn was given this name by the local people. This settlement belonged to a family of the Byzantine elite. The dedicatory inscription around the nave of the church mentions a certain Barbas—perhaps a native of Cappadocia who had imperial titles. Various details indicate the donor was a member of the wealthy aristocracy. This leaves the dedication of the church belonging to Nikephoros II Phokas or Constantine VIII, (Basil II's brother). Among the frescoes; Scenes about the life of Jesus (the Pantocrator), Gabriel and Peter are depicted. There are also scenes of the Three Magi, the birth of Jesus, the dream of Joseph, and the crucifixion of Jesus. There are also scenes such as the entrance of Jesus into Jerusalem, Jesus being put in the tomb and the angel Michael. The church is thought to have been built probably in the first half of the 11th century.
- Bezirhane Complex - a rock-cut complex with a built in church, dedicated to Theotokos.
- Ala Kilise ('Superb church'). There are depictions of the birth of Jesus, Anastasis (Christ Pantocrator's Descension into Hell), the Last Supper, the Blessing of the Virgin Mary, and the Saints.
- Meryem Ana Kilisesi ('Virgin Mary Church'), near the Selime cathedral.

Other churches Include: Batkın Kilisesi or ('Submerged church') also called (Açıkel Ağa Kilisesi or Generous, open-handed Agha Church), Davullu Güvercinliği Kilisesi ('Drum Dovecote Church'), Kemer Kilisesi, Eski Baca Kilisesi and the Koyunağılı Kilisesi ('Sheep Pen Church').

In the Niğde Archaeological Museum, there is a display of the mummies of a woman and four children who were entombed in the Ihlara Valley in the 10th century AD. The Aksaray Museum also has mummies from the Ihlara valley.

== Gallery ==
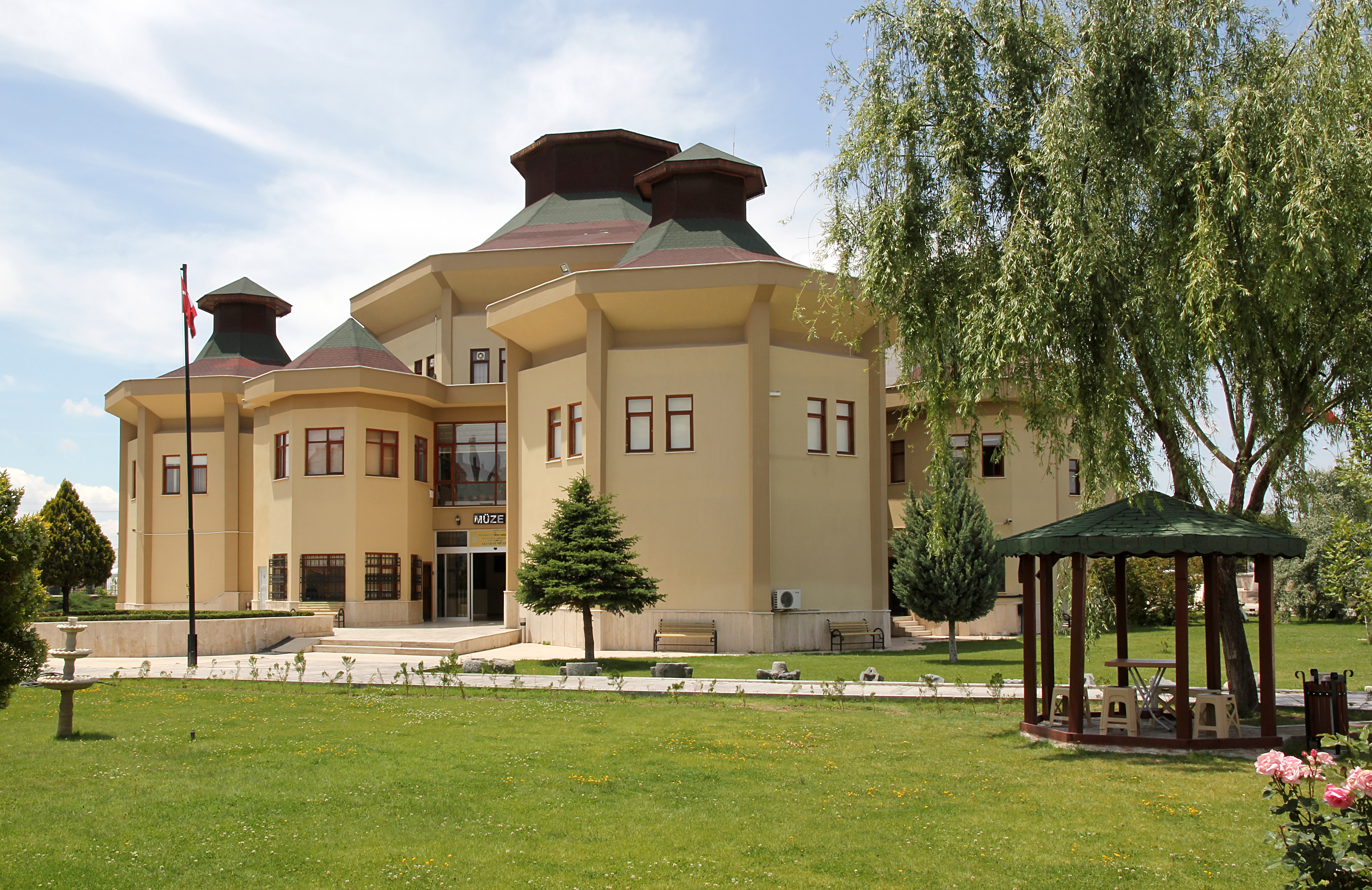
Aksaray Museum.

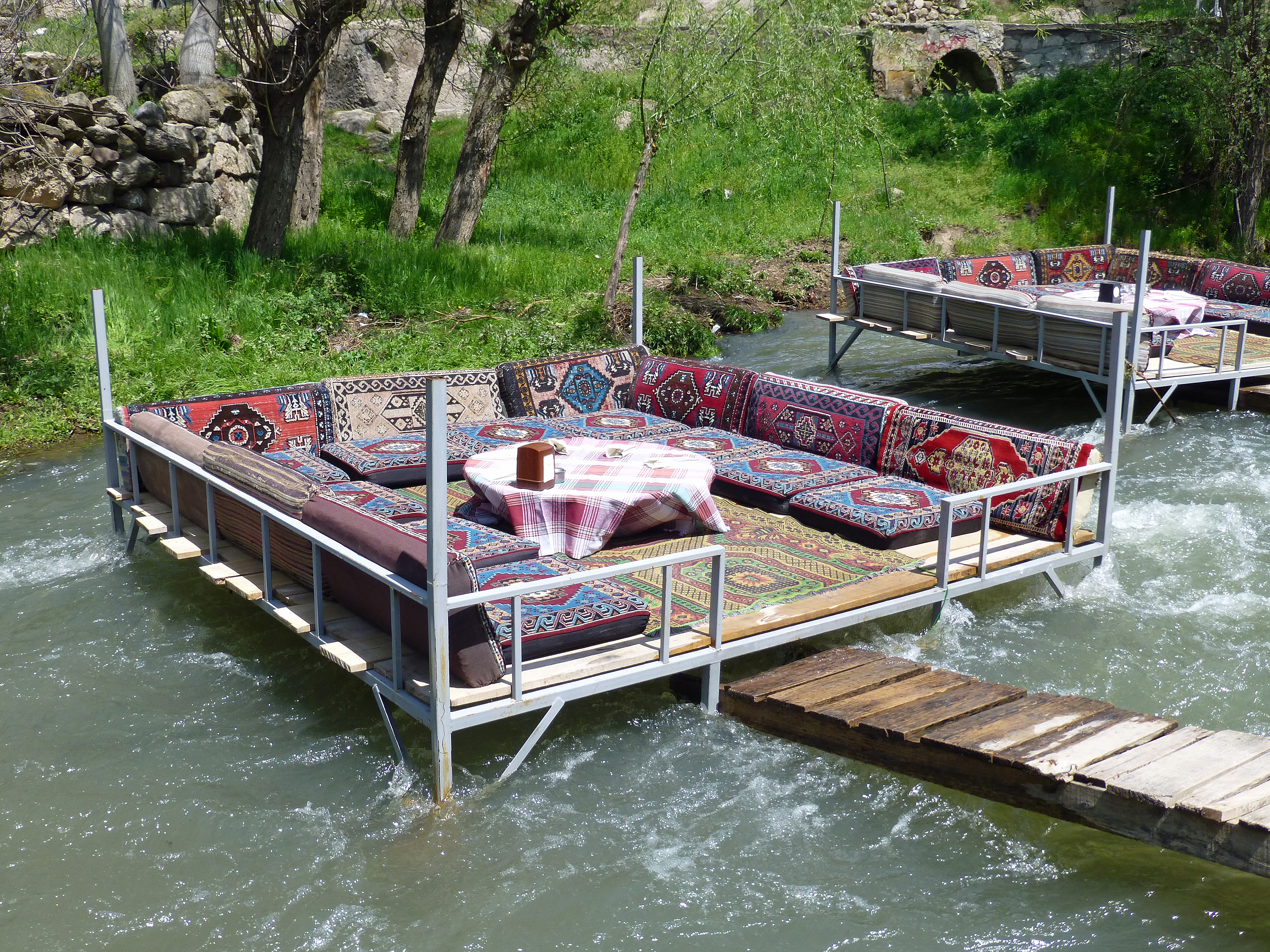
A popular restaurant on the Melendiz River

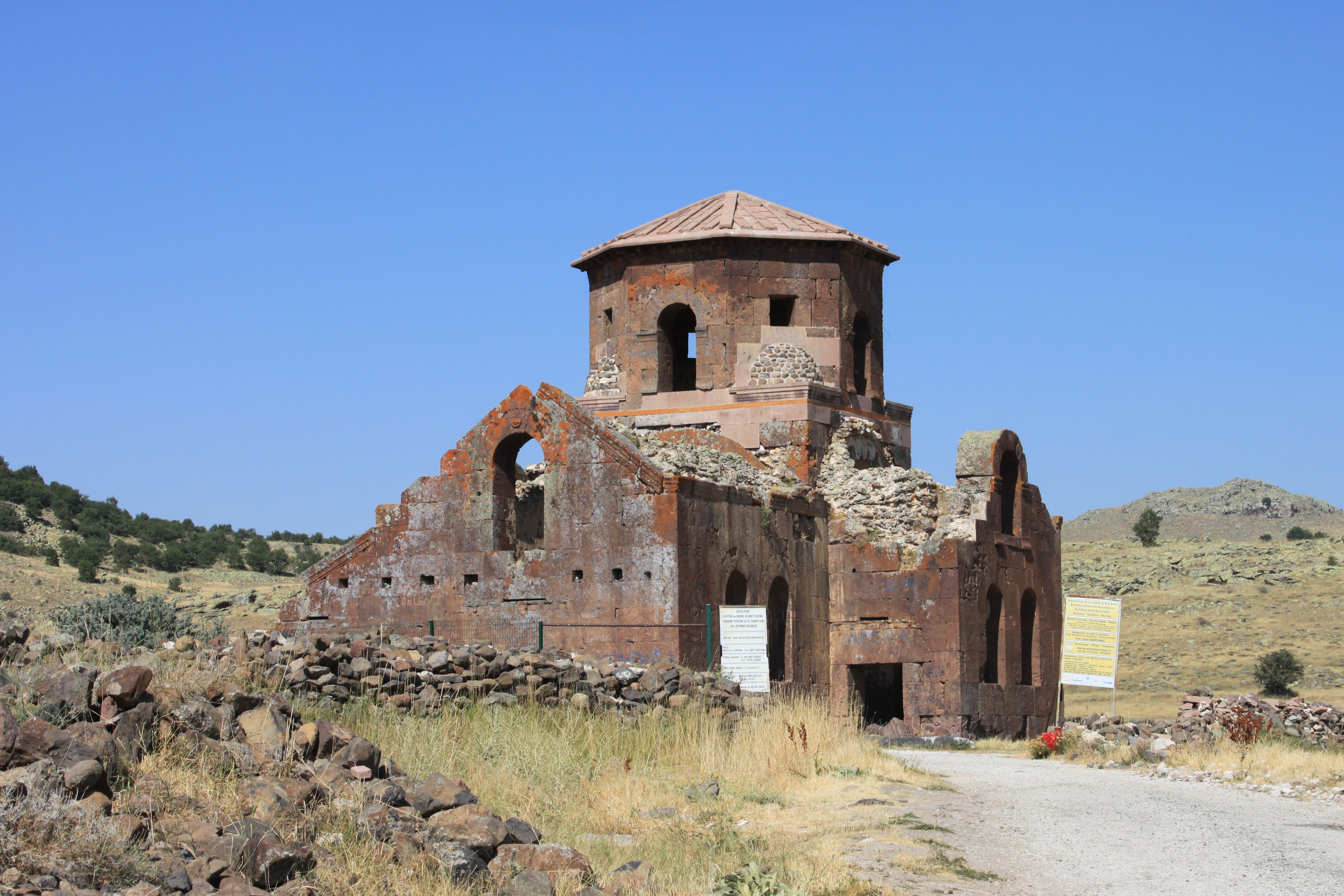
Kısıl Kilise, also known as the “Red Church” in Güzelyurt.

== See also ==
- Rock-cut architecture of Cappadocia
- Cappadocian Fathers

== Bibliography ==
- Peter Daners, Volker Ohl: Kappadokien. Dumont, 1996, ISBN 3-7701-3256-4
- Marianne Mehling (ed.): Knaurs Kulturführer in Farbe Türkei. Droemer-Knaur, München 1987, ISBN 3-426-26293-2.
- Robert G. Ousterhout: A Byzantine Settlement in Cappadocia.Dumbarton Oaks, 2005, ISBN 0-88402-310-9, on Google Books
