= Melendiz River =

River in Turkey

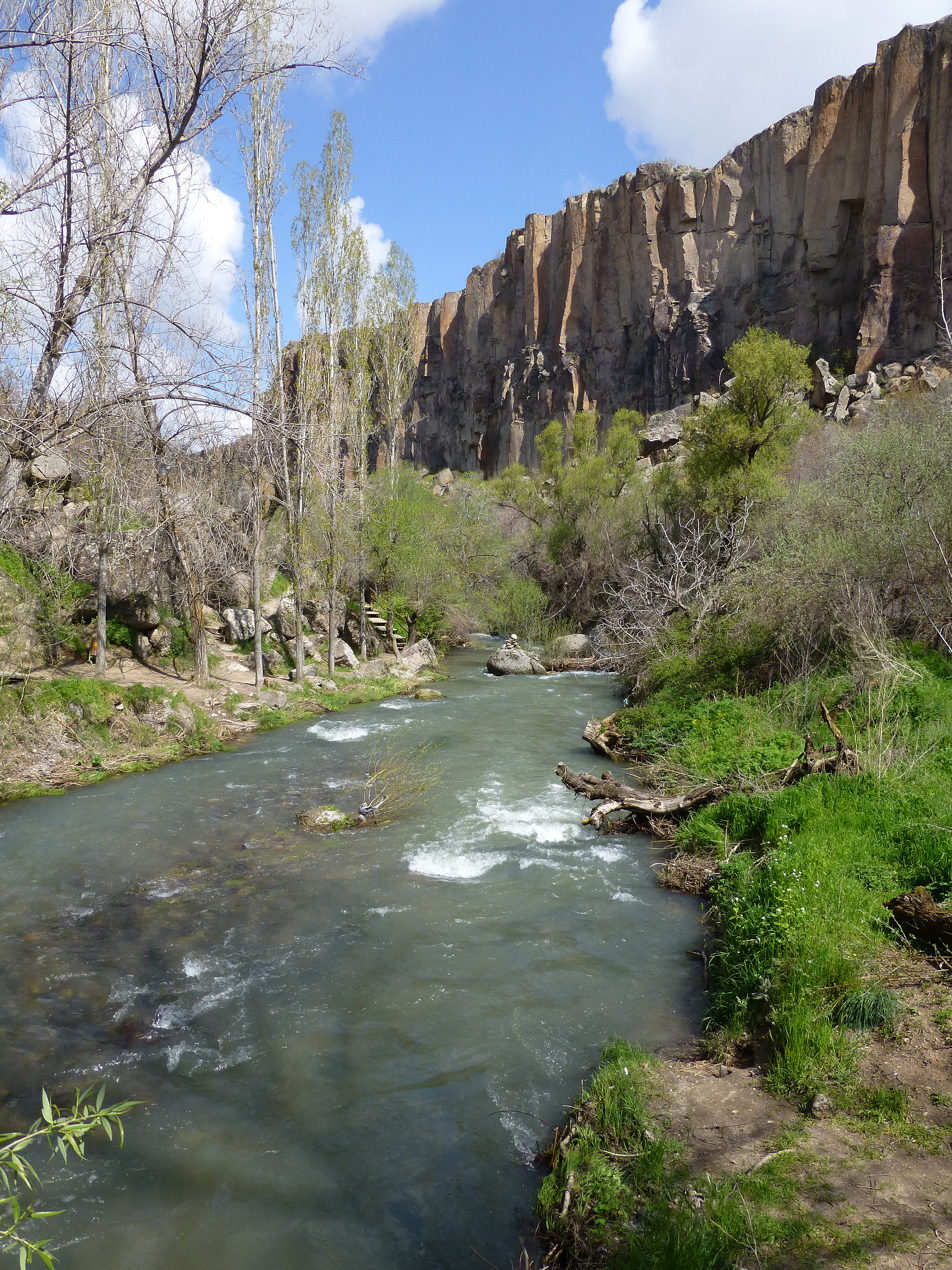
- the Melendiz river East of Ihlara valley

Location
- Country: Turkey
- Cities: Aksaray

Physical characteristics
- Length: 14 km (8.7 mi)

The Melendiz River (Turkish: Uluırmak), is a stream forming the Ihlara Valley in the territory of the Aksaray Province, Turkey. In ancient times, its name was Potamus Kapadukus (Cappadocia River). It arises from Melendiz Mountain (Mt. Melendós in antiquity), passes through Ihlara Valley and Aksaray city center and empties into Tuz Lake.

It is formed by the merging of springs and streams from the skirts of Melendiz Mountain. The catchment area (basin) is 565.2 km^{2}. The annual average flow in Selime Village is 72.99 hm³. The flow decreases in summer and increases with spring rains. Since it is fed from sources, it does not dry completely in summer. Its length is 60 km. The flow coefficient is 0.141. In the permeable terrain with Tuff, the majority of precipitation does not appear to run off.

== Geography ==
The Melendiz River stream originates from Melendiz Mountain, nearby Mount Hasan in Sultan Pinari, Çiftlik, Niğde. It then flows into the Ihlara Valley, passing by villages such as Ihlara, Ilısu, Selime, the archaeological site of Aşıklı Höyük, and cuts through the heart of Aksaray city, splitting Aksaray into North-West and South-East. On the way, it creates the Mamasun Reservoir.

== Gallery ==
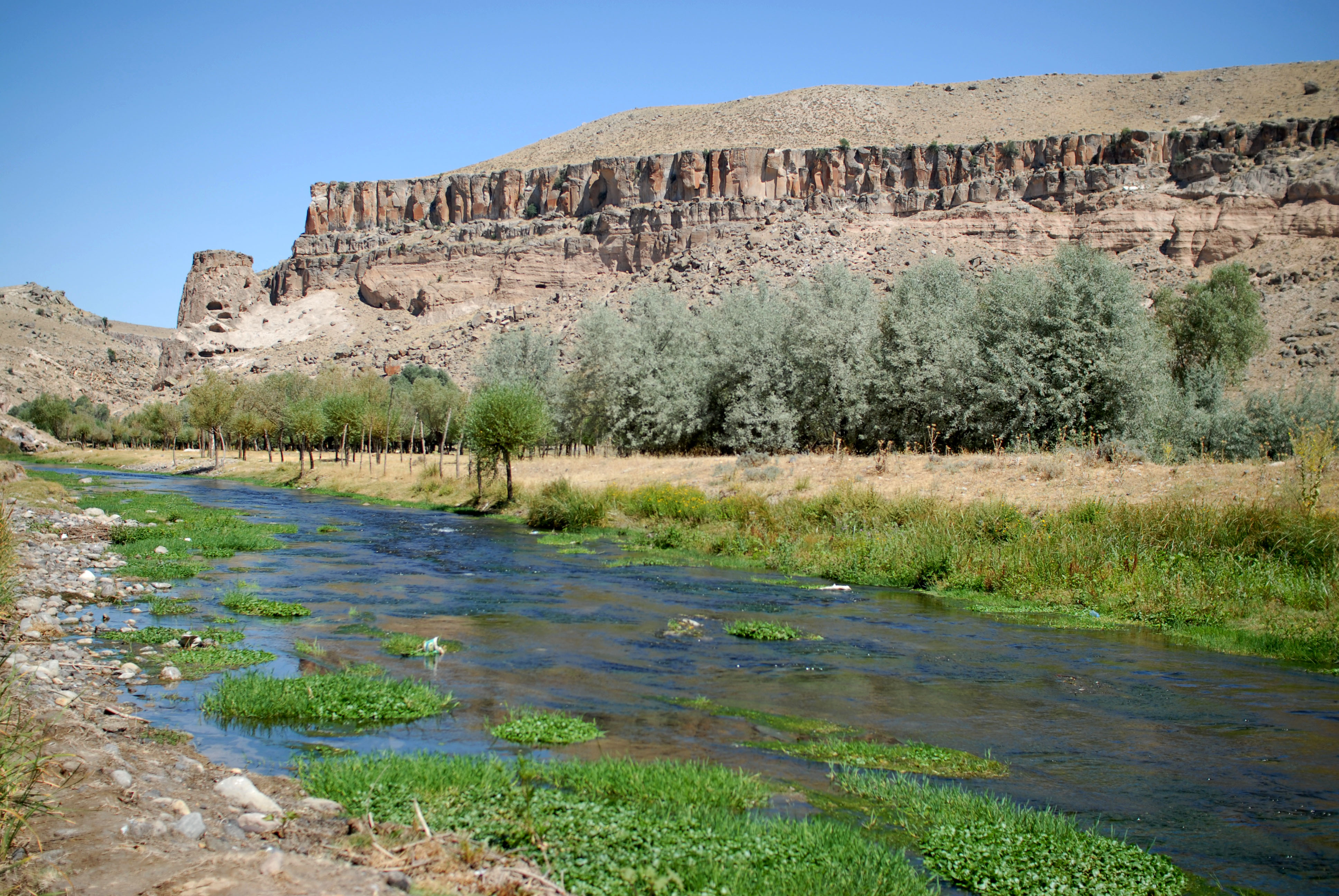
The Melendiz River in Ihlara Valley
