= Ilısu, Aksaray =

Ilısu
- Village
- Location in Turkey Ilısu (Turkey Central Anatolia)
- Coordinates: 38°14′N 34°21′E
- Country: Turkey
- Province: Aksaray
- District: Güzelyurt
- Elevation: 1,330 m (4,360 ft)
- Population (2021): 951
- Time zone: UTC+3 (TRT)
- Area code: 0382

Ilısu is a village in Güzelyurt District of Aksaray Province, Turkey. Its population is 951 (2021). It is situated on the north of the river Melendiz.

Ilısu is a part of Ihlara Valley, a valley famous for historical ruins. There is a historical cave which houses a Roman bath and a Roman bridge as well as geothermal springs in the town.

== History ==
The village has had the same name since 1919. The municipality status of the town, which became a municipality on 31 December 1987, ended in 2013 when its population fell below 2000 people.
