= Bozcayurt, Güzelyurt =

Bozcayurt
- Village
- Location within Turkey Location within Turkey Central Anatolia
- Coordinates: 38°21′N 34°24′E
- Country: Turkey
- Province: Aksaray
- District: Güzelyurt
- Population (2021): 355
- Time zone: UTC+3 (TRT)
- Area code: 0382

Bozcayurt, formerly known as Mandama (Greek: Μαντάμα), is a village in the Güzelyurt District, Aksaray Province, Turkey. Its population is 355 (2021).
