= Uzunkaya, Güzelyurt =

Uzunkaya
- Village
- Location within Turkey Location within Turkey Central Anatolia
- Country: Turkey
- Province: Aksaray
- District: Güzelyurt
- Population (2021): 521
- Time zone: UTC+3 (TRT)

Uzunkaya is a village in the Güzelyurt District, Aksaray Province, Turkey. Its population is 521 (2021).
