= Alanyurt, Güzelyurt =

Alanyurt
- Village
- Location within Turkey Location within Turkey Central Anatolia
- Coordinates: 38°20′N 34°19′E
- Country: Turkey
- Province: Aksaray
- District: Güzelyurt
- Elevation: 1,560 m (5,120 ft)
- Population (2021): 229
- Time zone: UTC+3 (TRT)
- Postal code: 68500
- Area code: 0382

Alanyurt is a village in Güzelyurt District of Aksaray Province, Turkey. Its population is 229 (2021). Its distance to Güzelyurt is 12 kilometres (7.5 mi) and to Aksaray is 35 kilometres (22 mi). The agricultural land around the village is not sufficient to support the village, therefore a part of the village populace works in construction business in big cities.
