= Güzelyurt District, Aksaray =

District of Aksaray Province, Turkey

Güzelyurt District
- District
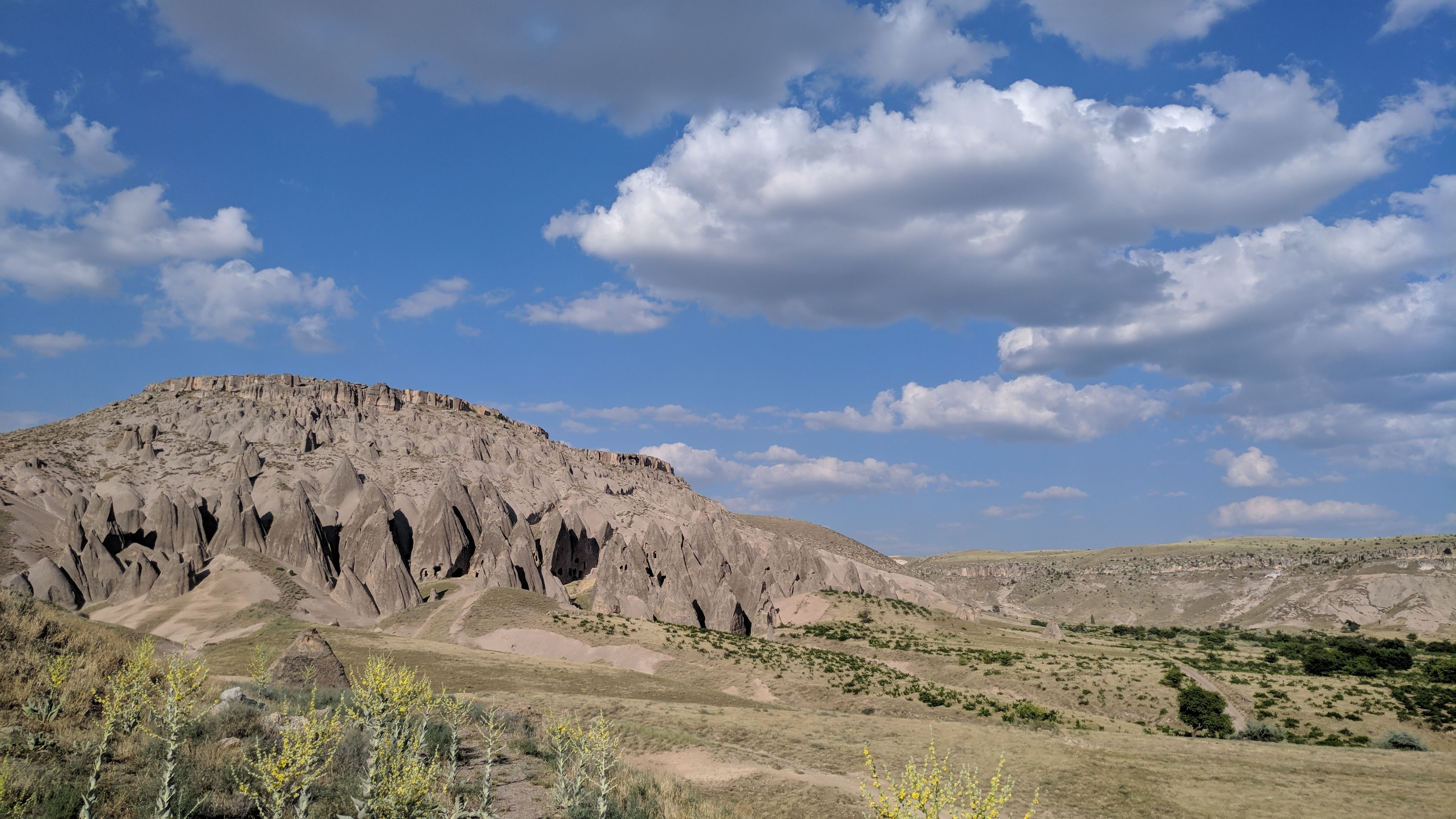
- fairy chimneys, Selime, Güzelyurt

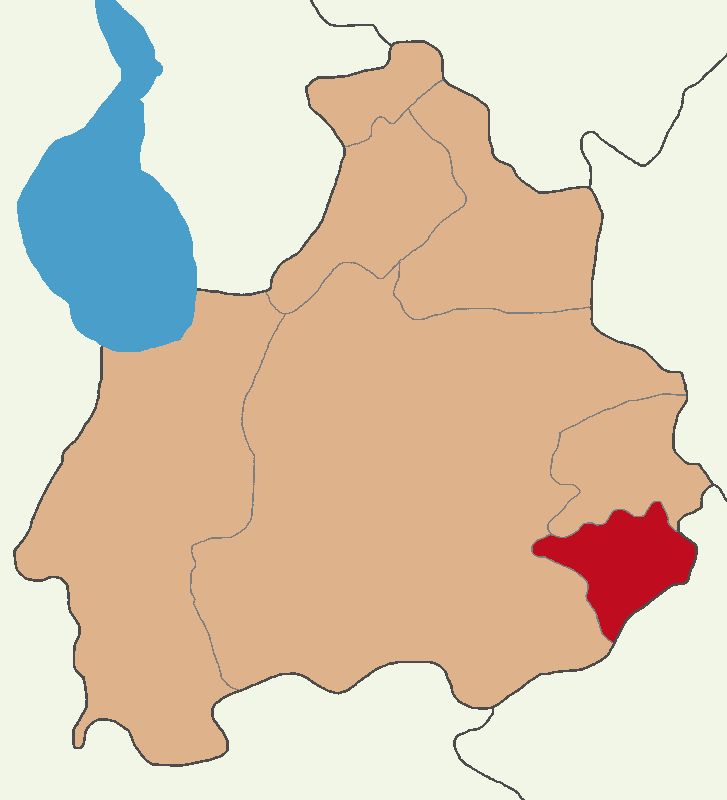
- Map showing Güzelyurt District in Aksaray Province

- Location within Turkey Location within Turkey Central Anatolia
- Coordinates: 38°17′N 34°22′E
- Country: Turkey
- Province: Aksaray
- Seat: Güzelyurt

Government
  - Kaymakam: Can Alperen Taşavlı
- Area: 285 km^{2} (110 sq mi)
- Population (2025): 10,419
  - Density: 36.6/km^{2} (94.7/sq mi)
- Time zone: UTC+3 (TRT)
- Area code: 0382
- Website: www.guzelyurt.gov.tr

Güzelyurt District is a district of Aksaray Province of Turkey. Spread over an area of 285 km^{2} (110 sq mi), it is the second smallest district by area in the province. It had a population of 10,419 in 2025. The district consists of three municipalities and eight villages.

== History ==
Archeological evidence dates the human occupation in the region to the Chalcolithic period. The region subsequently came under the influence of the Hittites and Persian Empire. Güzelyurt was historically known as Karballa during the Roman and Byzantine Empire, and subsequently as Gelveri under the Seljuk Empire. Christianity was introduced to the region by Saint Paul, and the region served as a refuge during the early Roman Empire and the later during the Byzantine Iconoclasm. Several historical structures are found in the Ihlara and Manastir valleys.

The settlement remained under the control of the Ottoman Empire until the population exchange between Greece and Turkey in 1924, when much of its Greek population emigrated to Greece and Muslim immigrants from Greece settled in Güzelyurt. Güzelyurt District was established by Law No. 3578 on 15 June 1989.

== Geography ==
Güzelyurt District is a district of Aksaray Province, located in the Central Anatolia region of Turkey. It is spread over an area of 285 km^{2} (110 sq mi), and is the second smallest district by area in the province. It is located at an average altitude of 1,485 m (4,872 ft), on a plateau along Mount Hasan and Melendiz.

=== Administrative divisions ===
The district consists of municipalities of Güzelyurt, Ihlara, and Selime, and eight villages&ndashAlanyurt, Belisırma, Bozcayurt, Gaziemir, Ilısu, Sivrihisar, Uzunkaya, and Yaprakhisar.

== Demographics and economy ==
According to 2025 population statistics published by the Turkish Statistical Institute, Eskil District had a population of 10,419 inhabitants, including 5,277 males and 5,142 females. It was the third least populous district in Aksaray Province, accounting for approximately 2.4% of the provincial population. Its population declined by approximately 5.0% between 2020 and 2025, due to migration of people, who reside in difficult geographies to urban areas and other provinces.

The district had approximately 17,497 hectares (43,240 acres) of agricultural land in 2025. Tourism is an important economic activity in the district.
