= Basil Giakoupes =

Greek consul in the Byzantine period

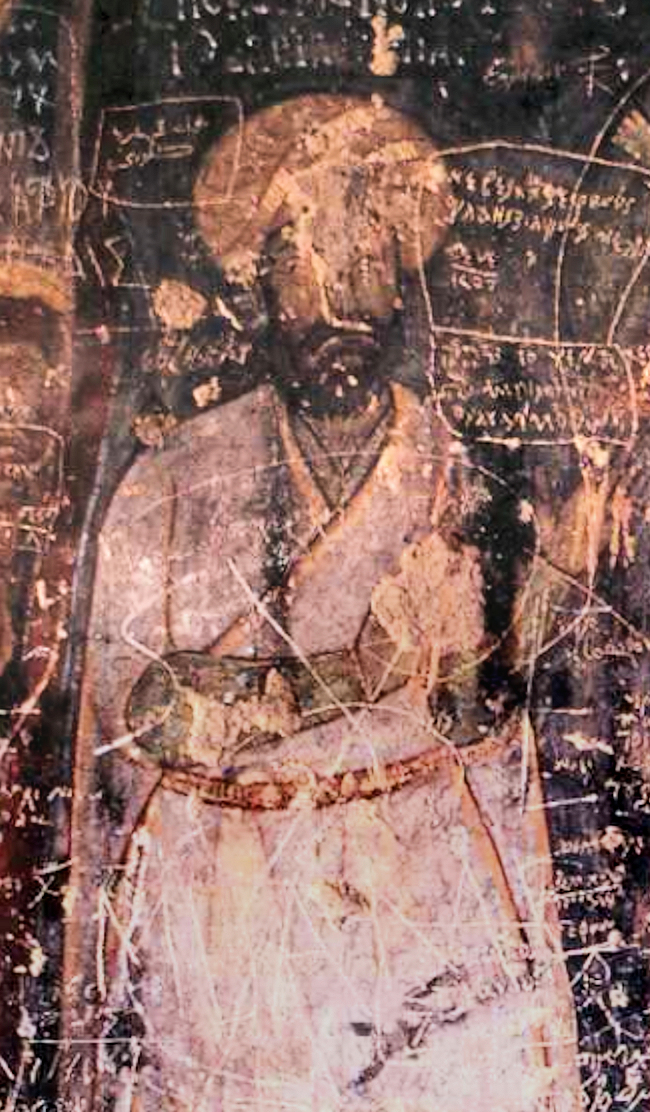
Basil Giakoupes

Basil Giakoupes, also Basileos Giagupes, was a Greek consul for the Byzantine emperor Andronikos II Palaiologos, at the court of the Sultanate of Rum ruler Mesud II. He commissioned the Kırkdamaltı Kilisesi, a church in the Ihlara valley of southern Anatolia.

== Kırkdamaltı Kilisesi ==
He is mainly known for commissioning a Christian church inside a cave, replete with Christian iconography, the Kırkdamaltı Kilisesi (also Kırk dam altı Kilisesi, "Church with forty roofs", also called 'St. George's Church') in the Ihlara valley of southern Anatolia. In the frescoes of the church, he appears as a donor with his wife, the Georgian Tamar, standing around an oversize Saint George.

=== Deception in frescos ===
An inscription indicates that the fresco was created at the Byzantine emperor Andronikos II Palaiologos and the Seljuk ruler Mesud II, indicating a date of 1287-1293: "This most venerated church of the holy and glorious great martyr George has been excellently decorated by the much-valued diligence and effort of the depicted [here] kyra Tamar and the emir Basil Giakoupes in [the reign] of the highest and noblest great sultan Masout, when kyr Andronikos rules over the Romans... O crown-bearing martyr George of Cappadocia."

Basil Giakoupes appears in oriental clothing, wearing a turban and qaba'turki robe, crossed over the chest and tied at the waist, a dress initially associated with the Seljuks and the Ayyubids, but later adopted by Armenians, Georgians and even Sogdians. His clothing hints at the way some Christian elites found a place in Seljuk society. Basil Giakoupes also used the title of emir in the dedicatory inscription. Basil Giakoupes seems to have been sent by the Byzantine emperor Andronikos II Palaiologos to the court of the Sultanate of Rum ruler Mesud II as "emir", possibly to oversee palace services, bodyguards or troops.

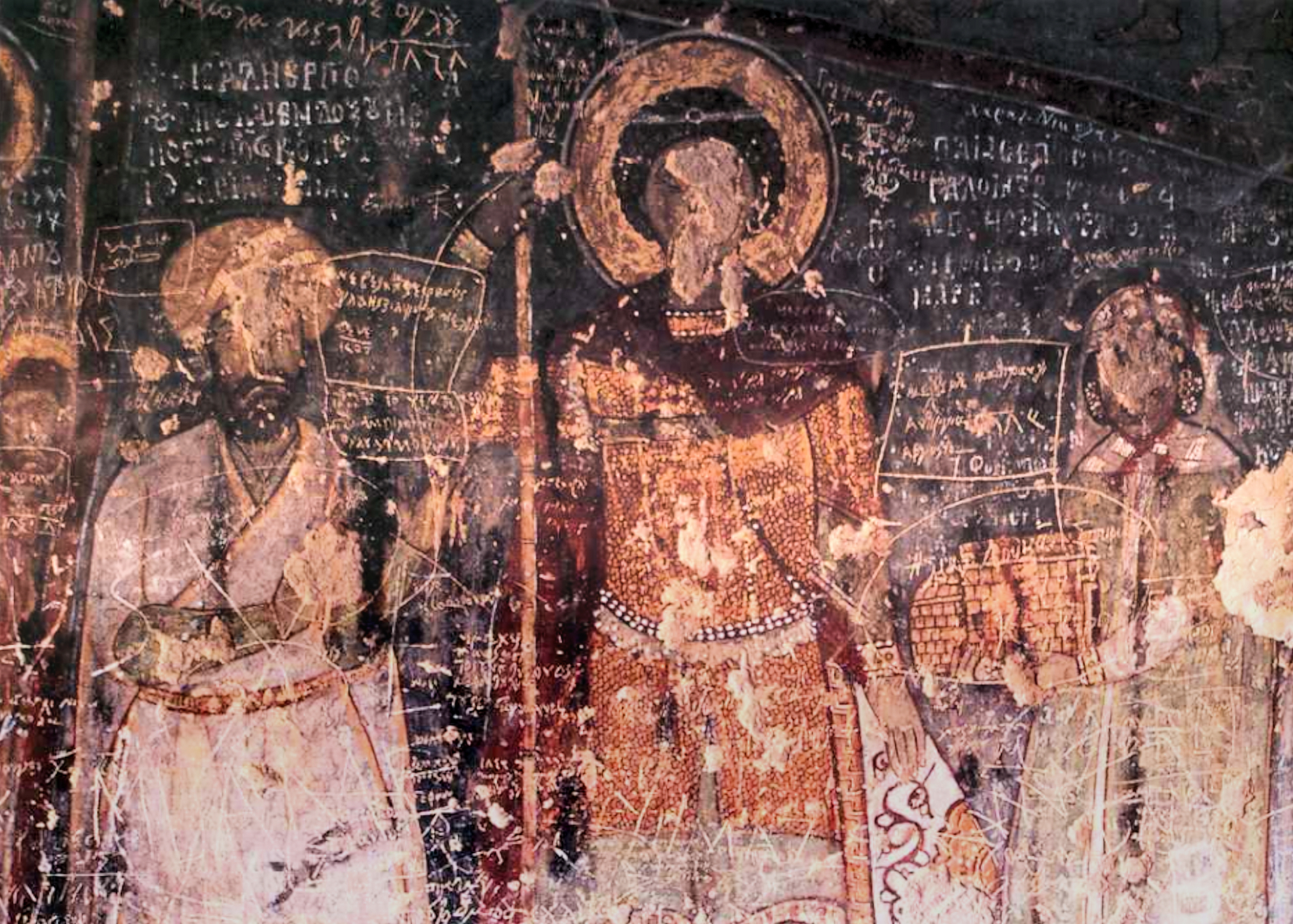
Basil Giakoupes and his wife Tamar, around Saint George. Kırkdamaltı Kilisesi.

== Tamar ==
His spouse Tamar wears a typical Christian dress: a loose green robe with a white-collared fitting dress, a veil, a cap and double hearrings. In the fresco, she is gifting the model of a church to Saint George. Besides being apparently the primary donor of the church, she is also recorded as gifting vineyards to local monastery, suggesting large personnel ressources. It is quite likely that this Tamar is the same person as the Georgian princess Tamar who has married Kaykhusraw II in 1238, otherwise known to the Seljuks as Gurji Khatun ("the Georgian Lady"). She was the daughter of Queen Rusudan (r. 1223–1245) and granddaughter of Queen Tamar of Georgia (r. 1184–1213). Tamar Gurji Khatun, first married to Kaykhusraw II, later married Mu'in al-Din Parwana (d. 1277), the parwana, an administrator appointed by the Mongols to oversee the Sultanate of Rūm. The Ilkhan Abaqa executed the parwāna in 1277, and Tamar may have remarried after that, to the local dignitary Basil Giakoupes.

== Sources ==
- Badamo, Heather A. (2023). Saint George between empires: image and encounter in the medieval East. University Park, Pennsylvania: The Pennsylvania State University Press. pp. 39, 40. ISBN 978-0271095226.
- Blessing, Patricia (8 March 2017). Architecture and Landscape in Medieval Anatolia, 1100-1500. Edinburgh University Press. ISBN 978-1-4744-1131-8.
- Jolivet-Lévy, Catherine (22 May 2013). La Cappadoce: Mémoire de Byzance (in French). CNRS Éditions. ISBN 978-2-271-07865-0.
