= Gaziemir, Güzelyurt =

Gaziemir
- Village
- Location within Turkey Location within Turkey Central Anatolia
- Coordinates: 38°21′06″N 34°23′19″E
- Country: Turkey
- Province: Aksaray
- District: Güzelyurt
- Population (2021): 993
- Time zone: UTC+3 (TRT)

Gaziemir is a village in the Güzelyurt District, Aksaray Province, Turkey. Its population is 993 (2021).

There is an underground city in this village. İts name is Gaziemir underground city. The underground city belongs to the Byzantine time.

There are two churches and one wine factory, a large camel staying place in the underground city.
