= Yaprakhisar, Güzelyurt =

Yaprakhisar
- Village
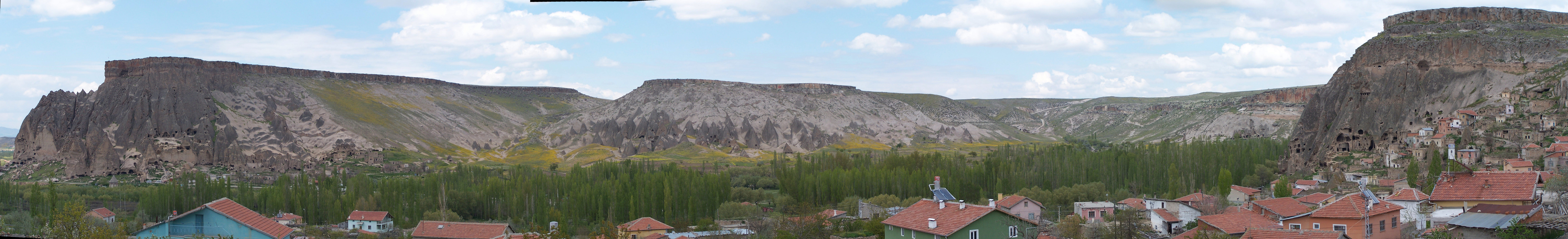
- Yaprakhisar (2009)

- Location within Turkey Location within Turkey Central Anatolia
- Coordinates: 38°18′N 34°16′E
- Country: Turkey
- Province: Aksaray
- District: Güzelyurt
- Population (2021): 326
- Time zone: UTC+3 (TRT)

Yaprakhisar is a village in the Güzelyurt District, Aksaray Province, Turkey. Its population is 326 (2021).
