= Selime, Güzelyurt =

Selime
- Municipality
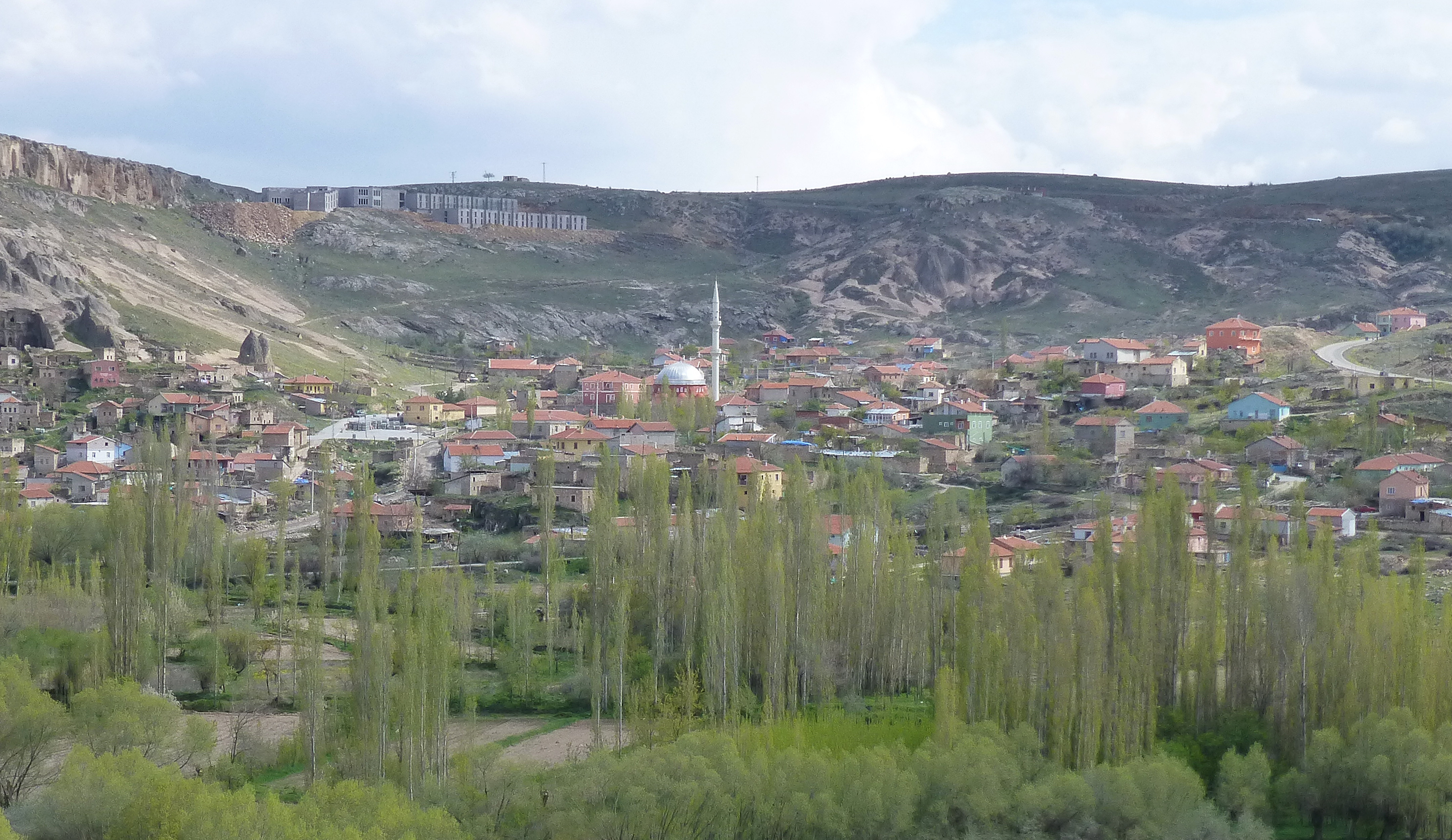

- Location within Turkey Location within Turkey Central Anatolia
- Coordinates: 38°18′N 34°16′E
- Country: Turkey
- Province: Aksaray
- District: Güzelyurt
- Population (2021): 1,796
- Time zone: UTC+3 (TRT)
- Area code: 0382

Selime formerly known as Salamis (Ancient Greek: Σαλαμίς) is a town (belde) and municipality in the Güzelyurt District, Aksaray Province, Turkey. Its population is 1,796 (2021).

== History ==
In these fairy chimneys lived Christians fleeing from Romans. When Christianity was accepted in Rome, churchs and cathedrals were built here.

There is a battle castle on a hill there. the Byzantines fought Ali Pasha from the Seljuk Dynasty in this castle. Ali Pasha became a martyr. Selime Tomb was built for him. Also, since this place was under the rule of Ottoman for many years, the Ottomans built Sinan Bey Mosque (1524) here.

Selime; It is one of the chimneys of volcano with heights of Hasan Mountain 3258 m, Melendiz Mountain 3000 m, Göllü Mountain 2650 m, which became active about 10 million years ago in the Upper Miocene period. This is a region where the precursor material cold tuffs that come out and cover a large area, then the tuffs that came into contact with the volcanic heat, and then the materials that flow from the craters and spread over the flat plain and form a layer of a certain thickness, is here. Natural events occurring over many millions of years "erosion; earthquakes, annual temperature difference, snow, rain, wind and [[Melendiz Stream] passing nearby ]] has provided this region with a natural look.

Selime became a municipality on July 1, 1992, with the status of municipality.

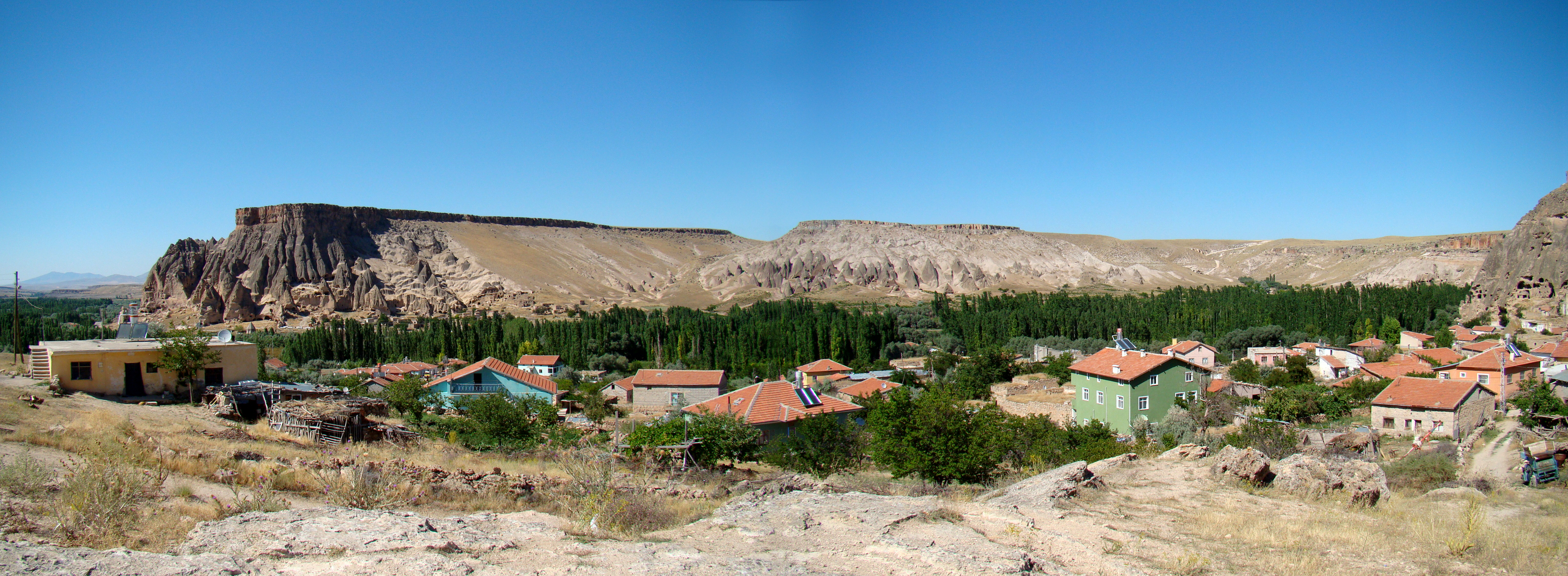
The Ihlara Valley as it ends near Yaprakhisar.

== Places of Interest ==
- Selime Cathedral
- Selime Peri Bacalari
- Selime Sultan Tomb

== Gallery ==
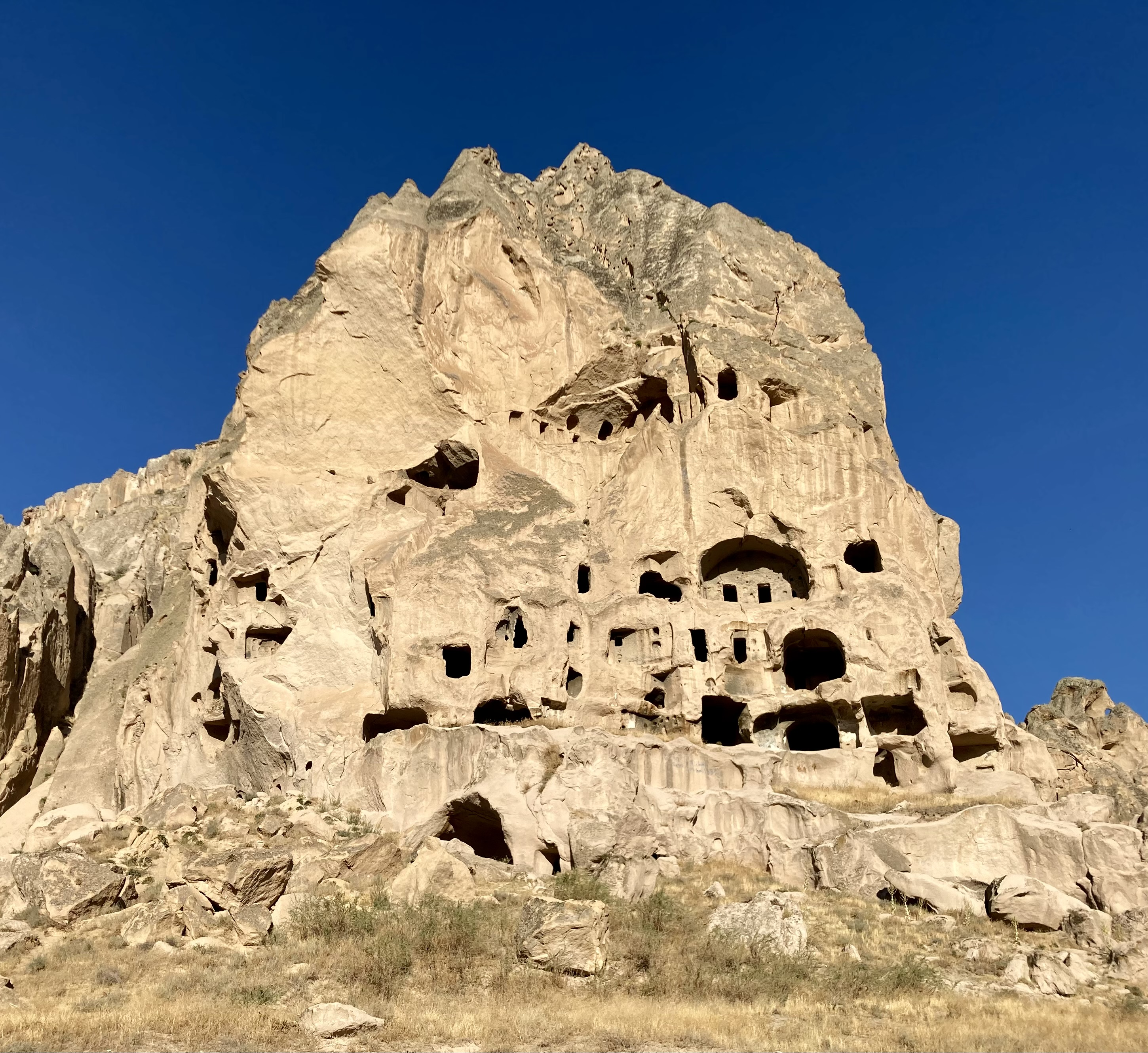
Selime castle

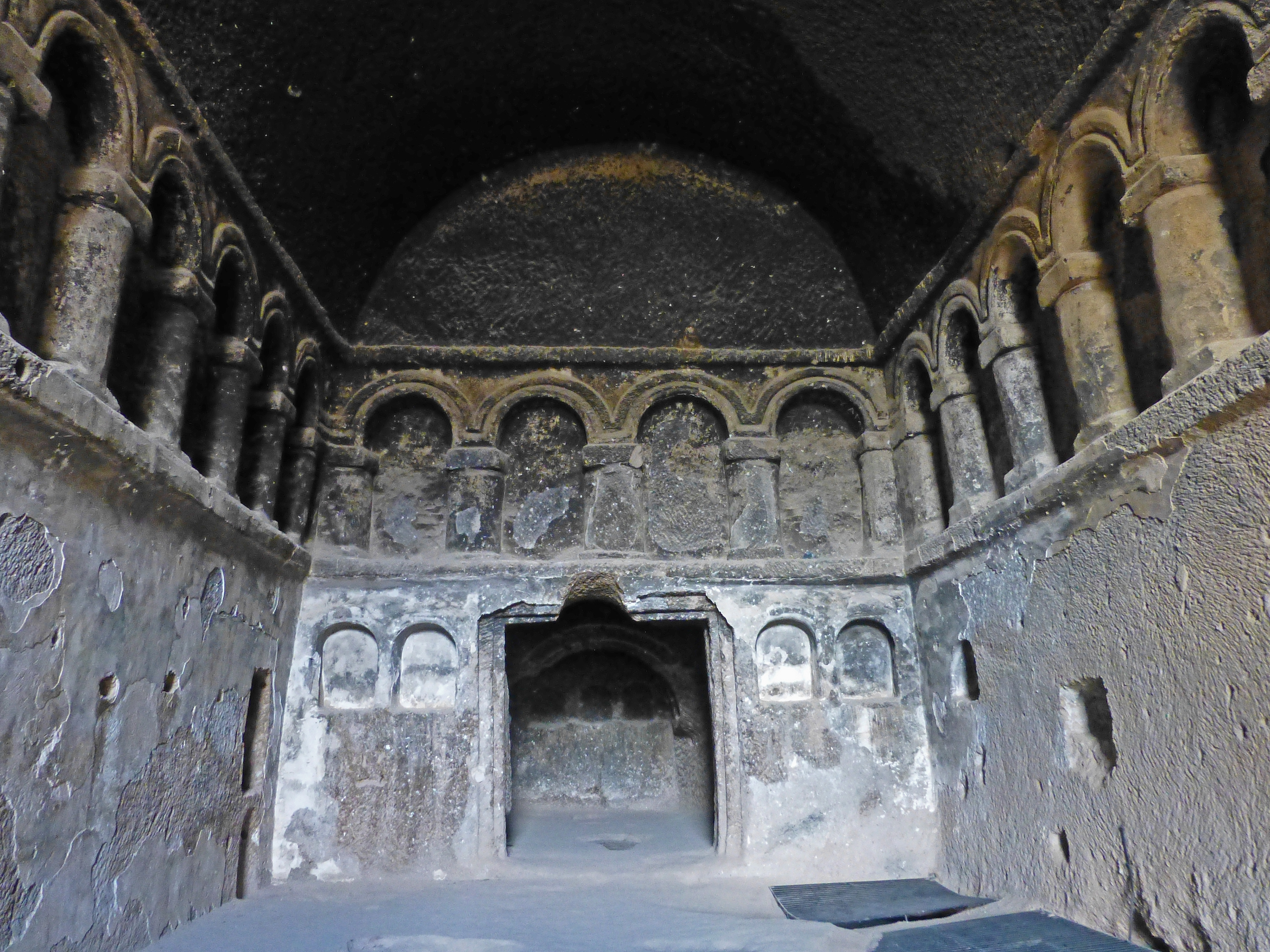
Church inside Selime castle

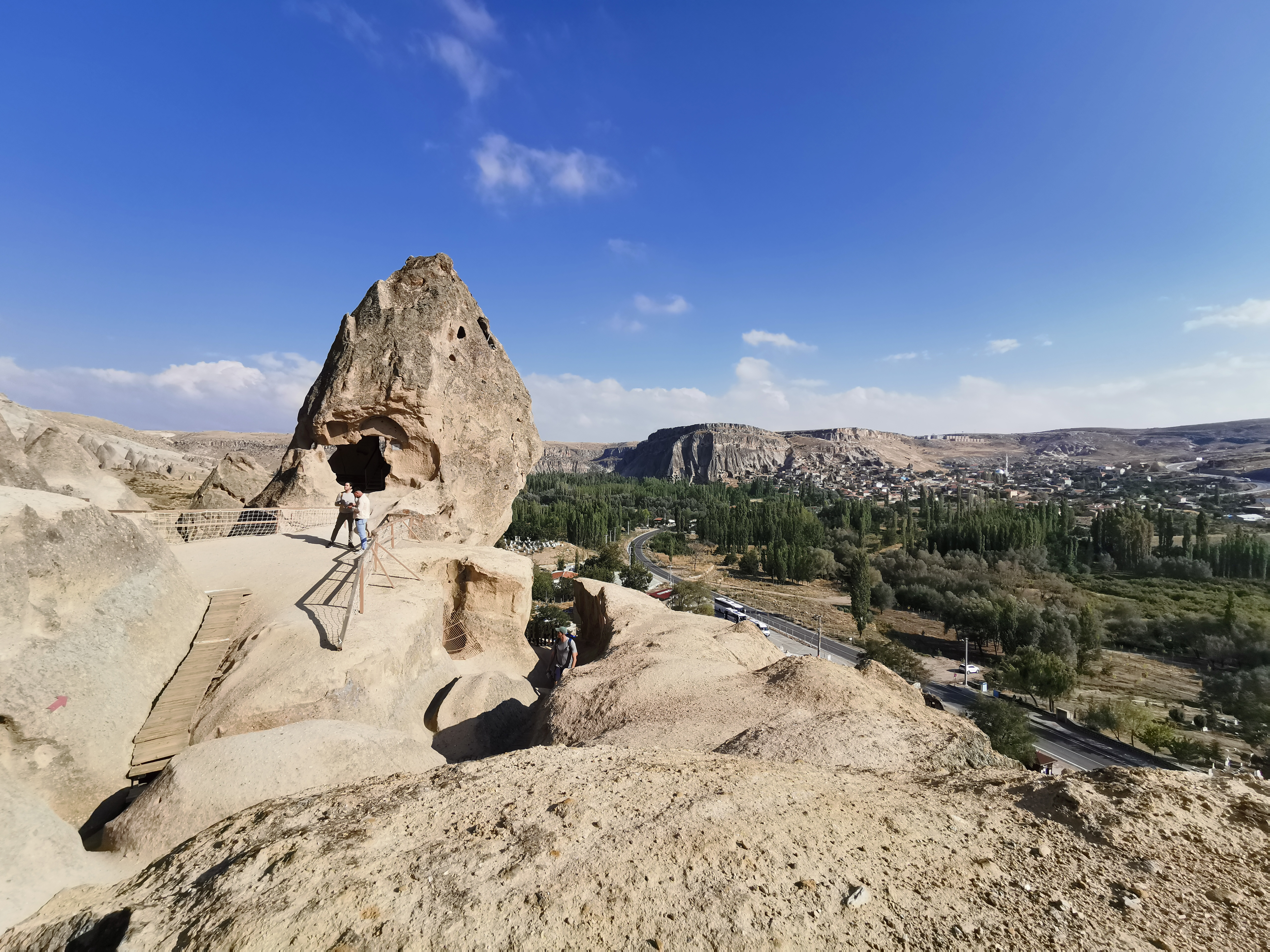
Selime Cathedral with a view of Selime in the background.

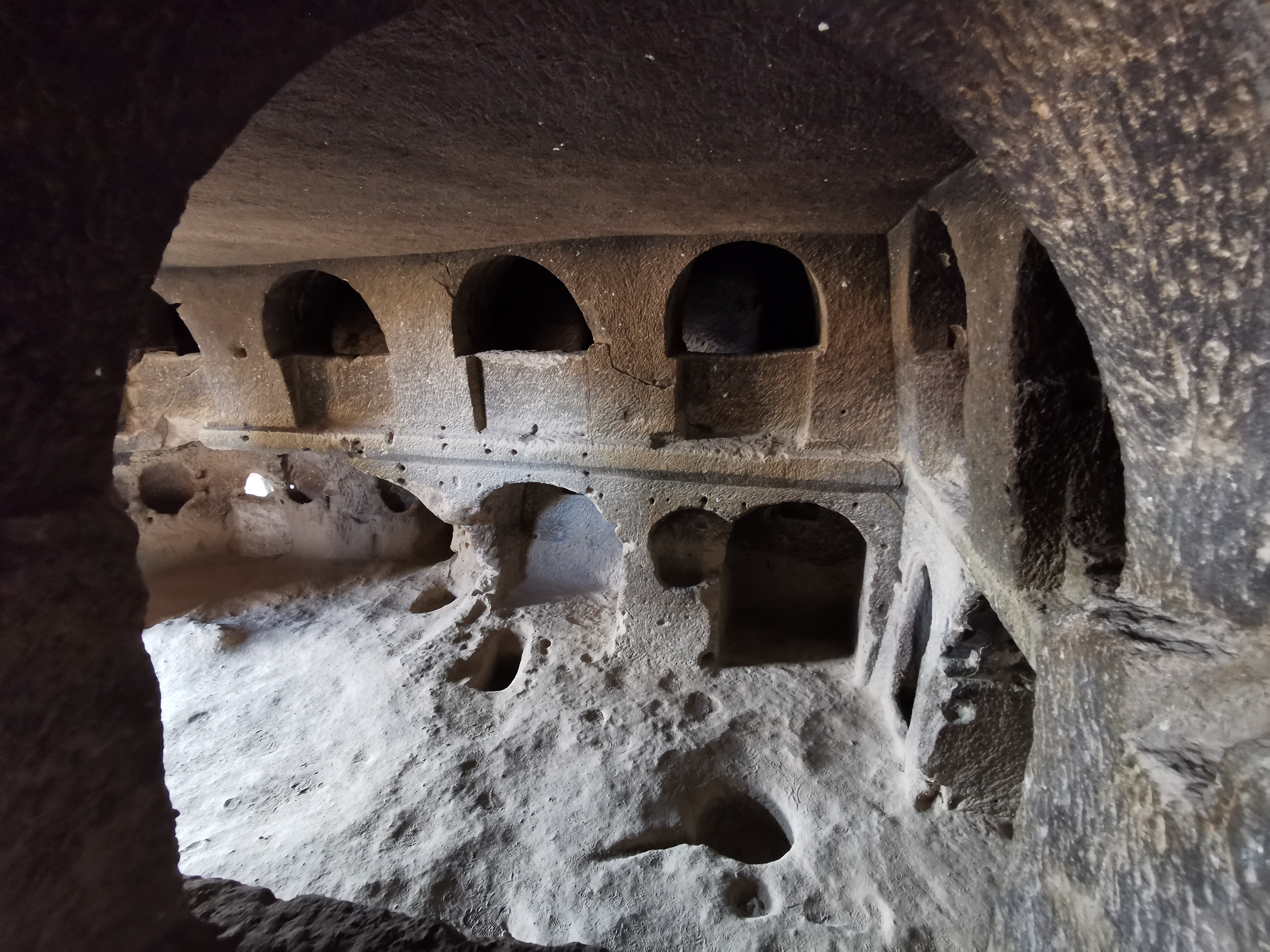
Inside Selime Cathedral

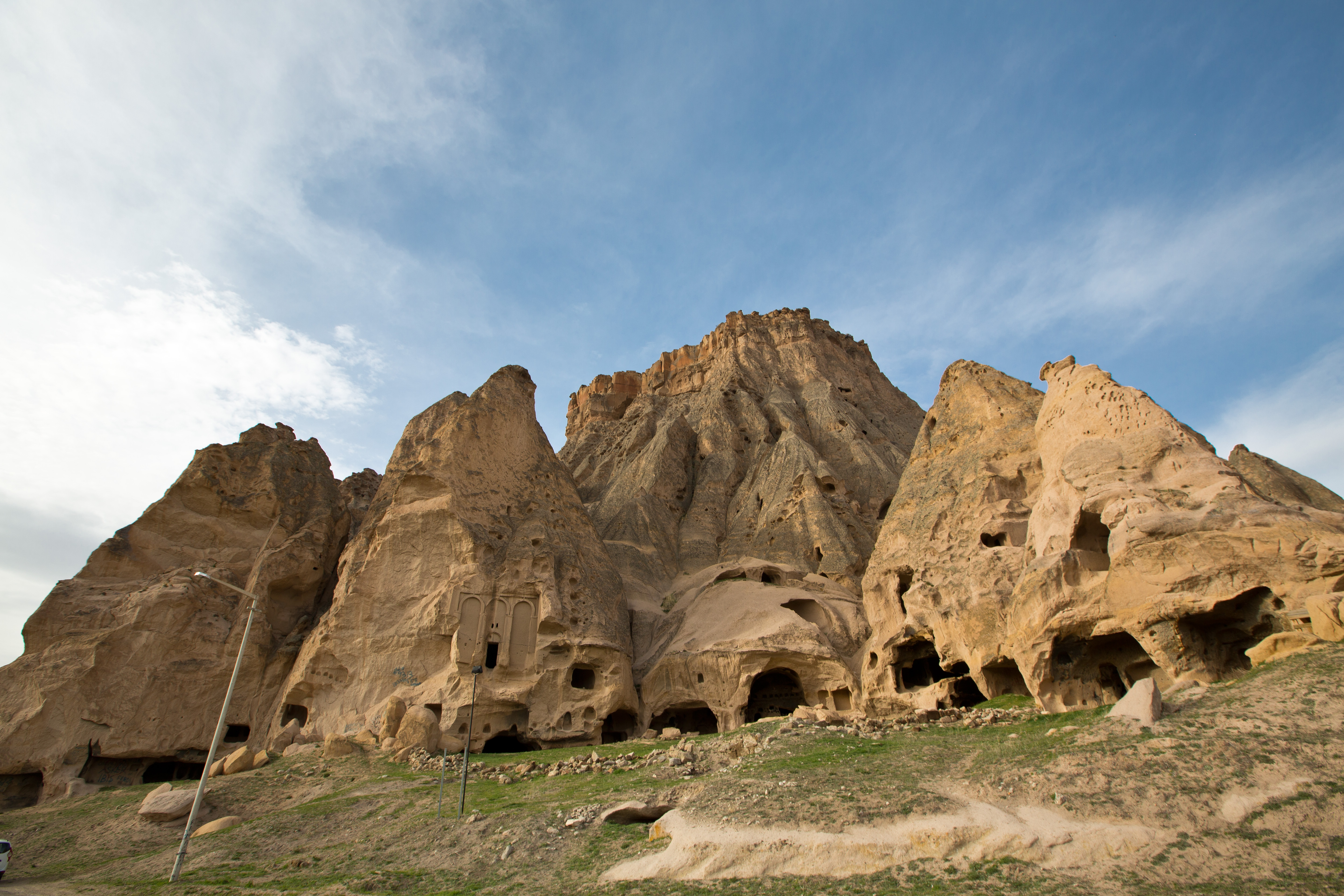
Selime Cathedral seen from below

== See also ==
- Selime Sultan Tomb
