= Güzelyurt =

- Municipality
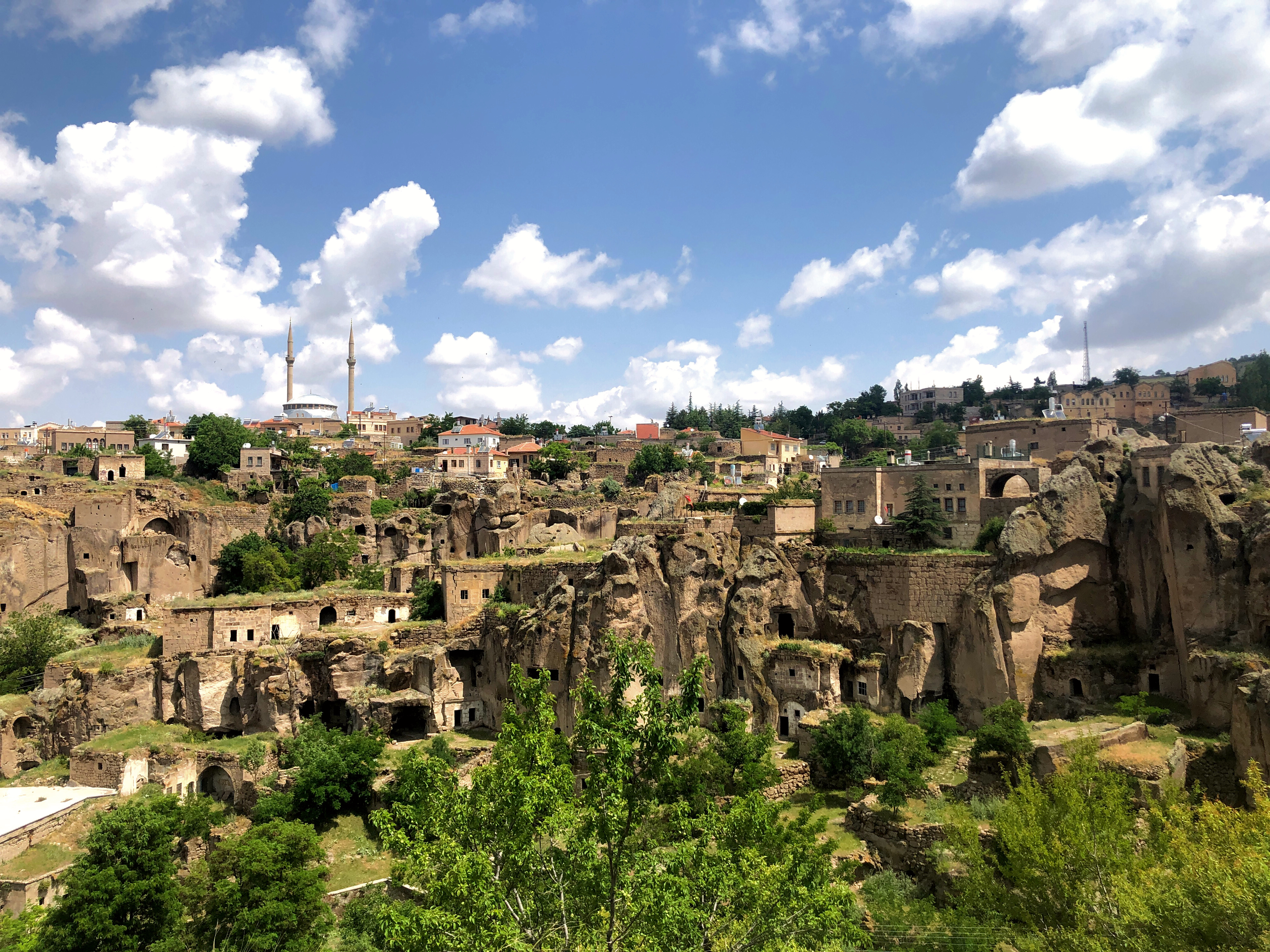

- Location within Turkey Location within Turkey Central Anatolia
- Coordinates: 38°16′38″N 34°22′19″E
- Country: Turkey
- Province: Aksaray
- District: Güzelyurt

Government
  - Mayor: Ünal Demircioğlu (AKP)
- Elevation: 1,485 m (4,872 ft)
- Population (2021): 2,570
- Time zone: UTC+3 (TRT)
- Area code: 0382
- Website: www.guzelyurt.bel.tr

Güzelyurt, meaning 'beautiful homeland', formerly Gelveri (Cappadocian Greek: Καρβάλη), is a town in Aksaray Province in the Central Anatolia region of Turkey, at a distance of 45 km (28 mi) from the city of Aksaray. It is the seat of Güzelyurt District. Its population is 2,570 (2021). Its elevation is 1,485 m (4,872 ft).

This area is part of the ancient region of Cappadocia, near the Ihlara Valley.

== History ==
Cappadocia has an important place in the history of Christianity and Gregory of Nazianzus lived in the area. A historically large native Cappadocian Greek population existed in the area until the 1924 population exchange (see Cappadocian Greeks), when they were replaced with the Turks from Thessaloniki and Kavala. The monastery, churches, refuge caves, and mansions attest to the culture of the Cappadocian Greek population.

== Places of interest ==
Güzelyurt is known for having three underground cities and over 50 churches carved into the rocky volcanic landscape including:

- Ihlara Valley
- Monastery Valley, "Manastır Vadisi"
- Fairy Chimneys, "Peri Bacaları"
- Antique Greek houses
- Ahmatlı Church
- St. Anargiros Church, "Sivişli Kilise"
- Koç Church
- Cathedral of Selime
- The rock monastery of Selime, one of the largest religious buildings in Cappadocia.
- Kızıl Kilise, "St. Spyridon Church" - a 5th or 6th century church (with an inscription dated to 1084) in the village of Sivrihisar.
- St. Analipsis Church, "Yüksek Kilise" (High Church) on the hill of Analipsis. Stone age relics have been found nearby.
- St. Gregorius Church, "Kilise Cami" - another rock-hewn church, in use today as a mosque
- Kalburlu Kilisesi ('Sieve church', also called St. Epthemios Church').
- Kömürlü Kilise, dedicated to St. Anargyros in the Monastery valley close to the Kalburlu church.
- Çömlekçi Kilise, near the Koç church.

Other places of interest include:

- The tomb of Selime Sultan in the village of Selime.
- Linseed House, "Bezirhane" in the village of Belisırma.
- The Priests House, also known as Papaz Evi.
- Ziga thermal springs, "Ziga kaplıcaları" is located in the village of Yaprakhisar very close to Ihlara Valley.
- Güzelyurt Pond Dam (Göleti)
- An underground city is situated in Gaziemir village of Güzelyurt.

== Image gallery ==
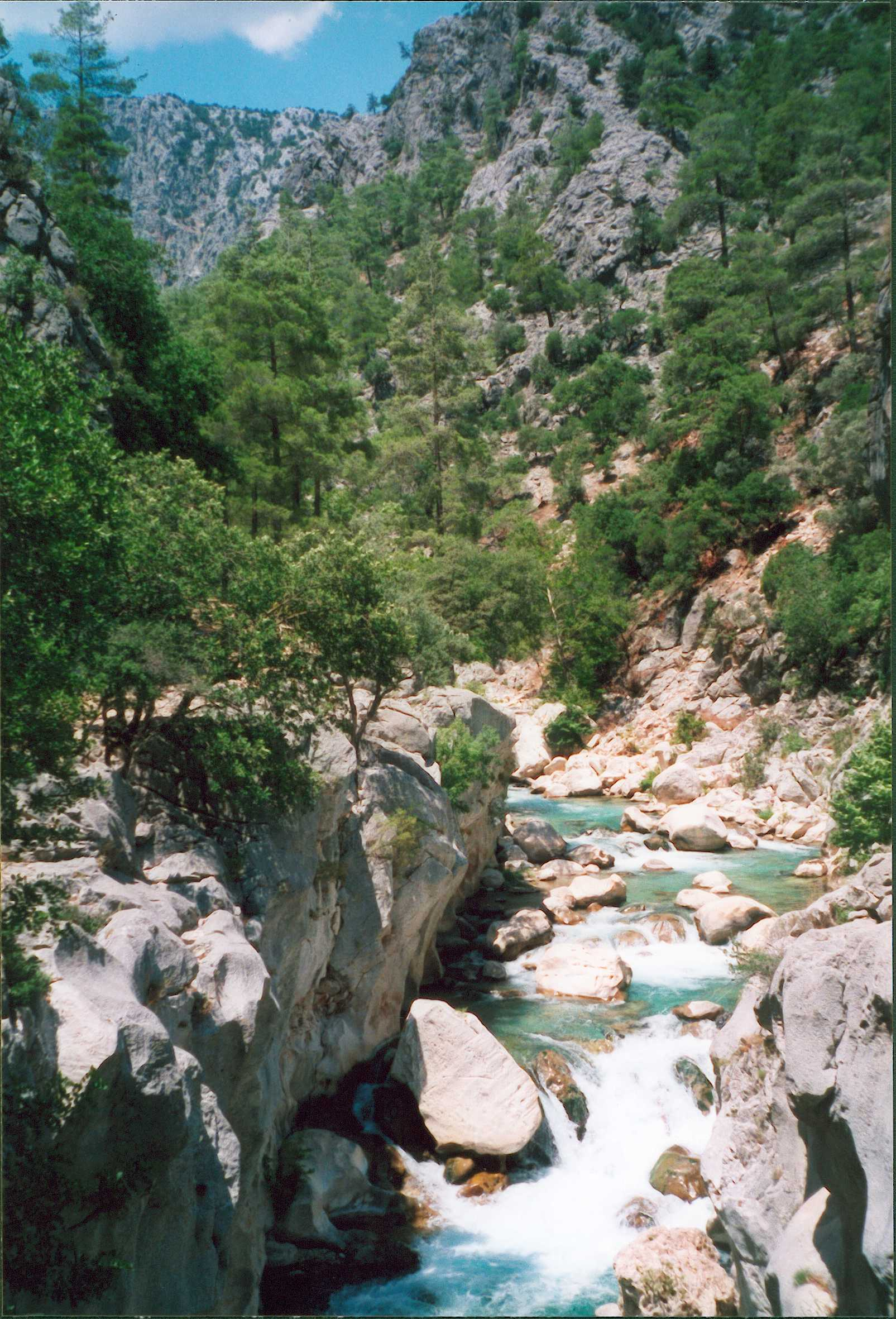
Ihlara Valley

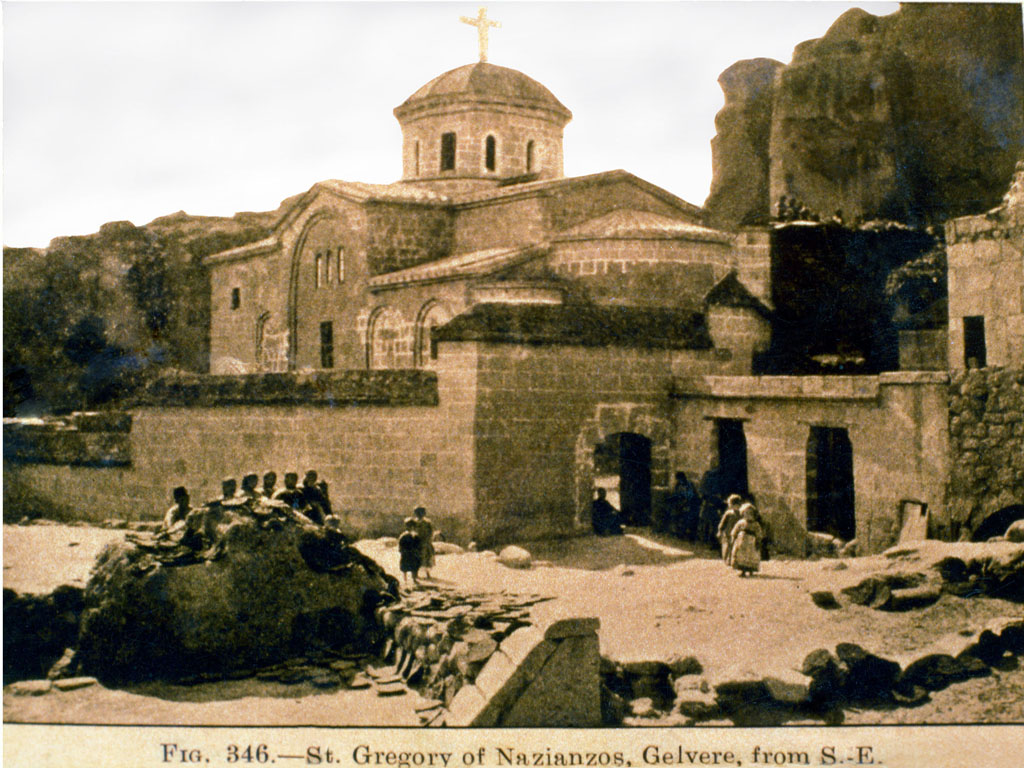
St. Gregorius Church

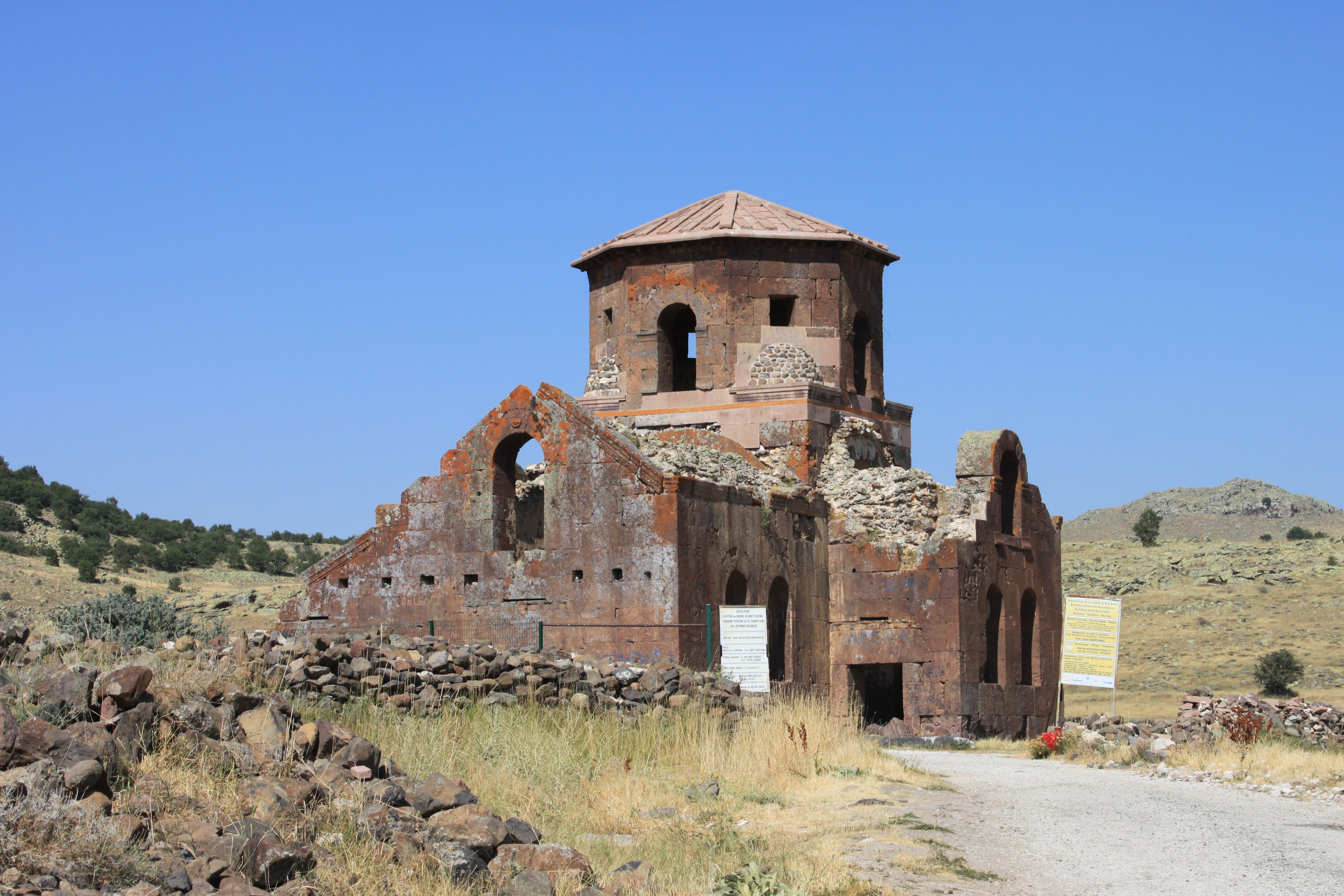
Kizil Kilise, meaning “Red Church” in Güzelyurt

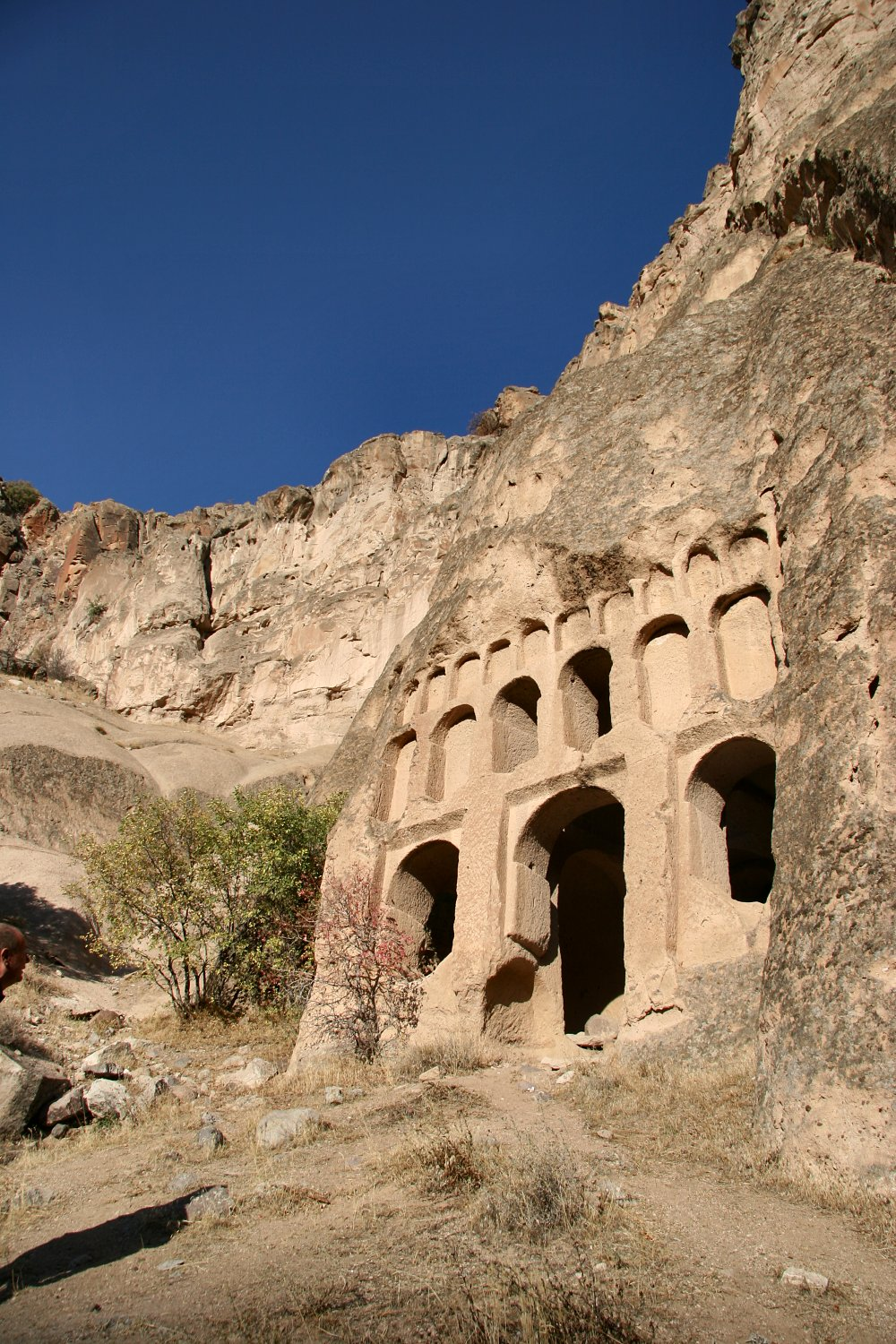
A church in Ihlara Valley

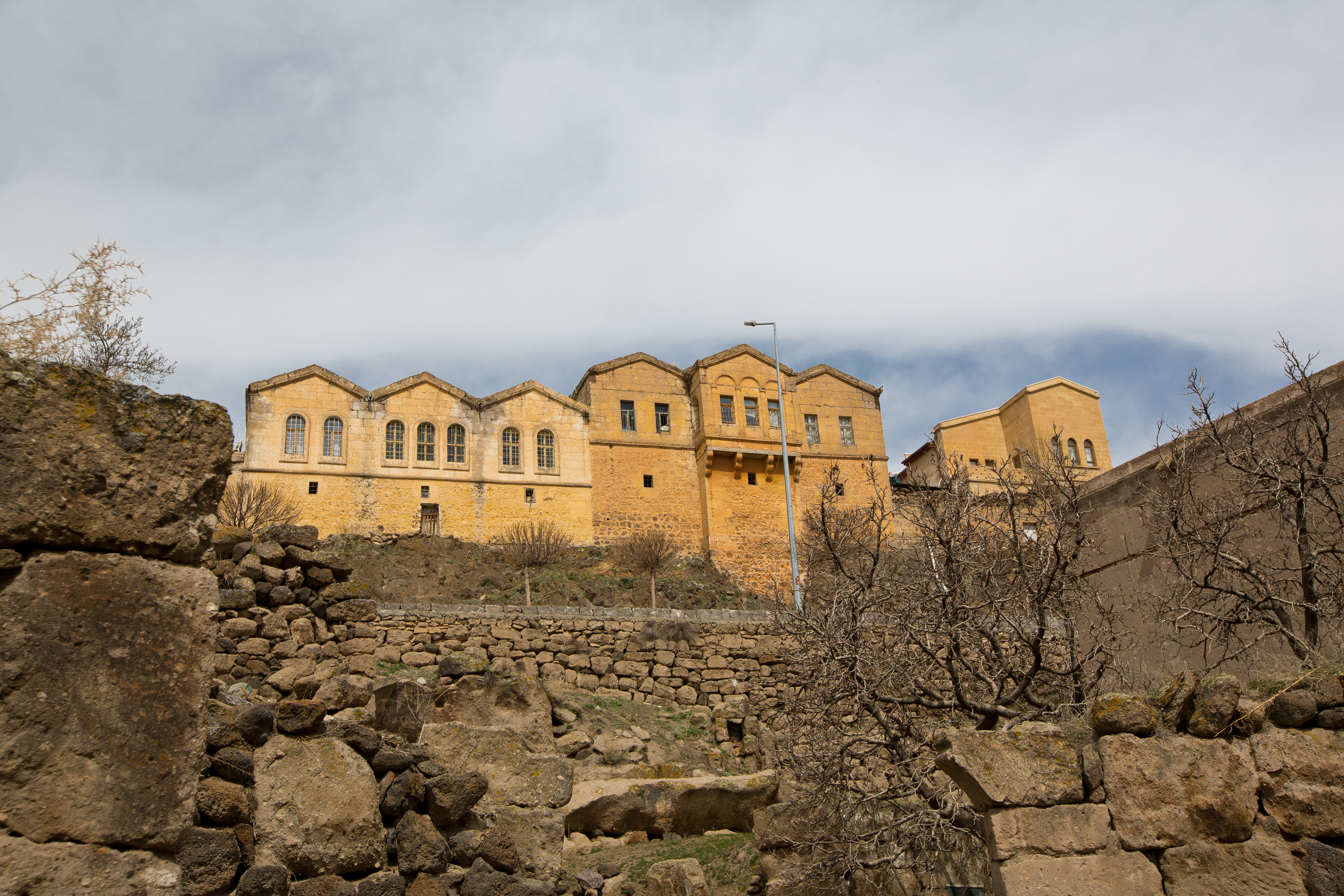
Historic houses in Güzelyurt

== See also ==
- Cappadocian Greeks
- Cappadocia
- Saint Gregory of Nazianzus
