= Belisırma =

- Village
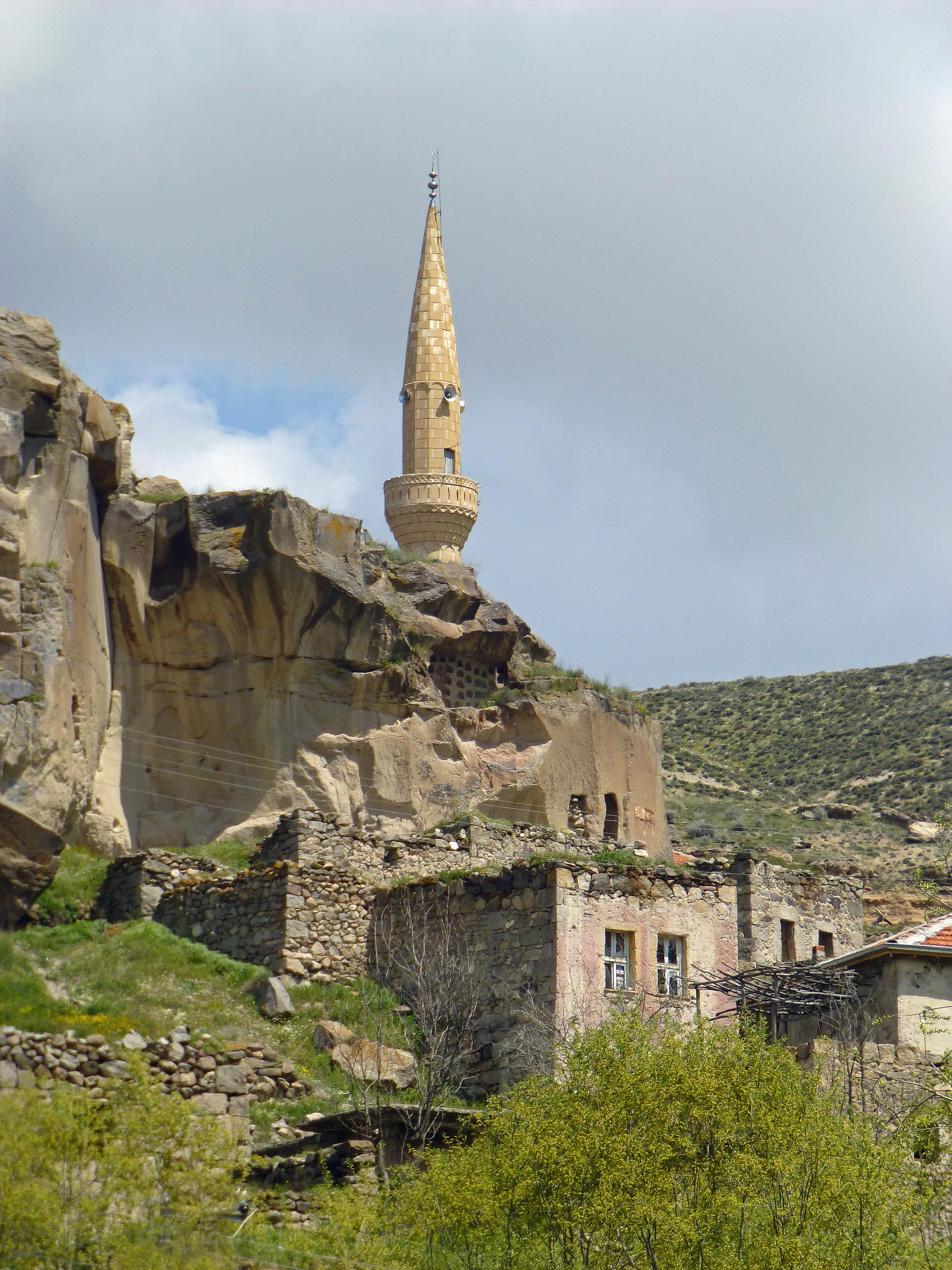
- Belisırma (2013)

- Location within Turkey Location within Turkey Central Anatolia
- Coordinates: 38°16′N 34°17′E
- Country: Turkey
- Province: Aksaray
- District: Güzelyurt
- Elevation: 1,230 m (4,040 ft)
- Population (2021): 502
- Time zone: UTC+3 (TRT)
- Postal code: 68500
- Area code: 0382

Belisırma is a village in Güzelyurt District, Aksaray Province, Turkey. Its population is 502 (2021). The distance to Güzelyurt is 11 kilometres (6.8 mi) and to Aksaray is 42 kilometres (26 mi). Although a small village, Belisırma is well known because of various ruins around it. The church ruins of Ala, Bezirhane, Karagedik and Direkli are Byzantine cave churches.
