= Grand Mosque of Aksaray =

Mosque in Aksaray, Turkey

Aksaray Grand Mosque
- Aksaray Ulu Camii
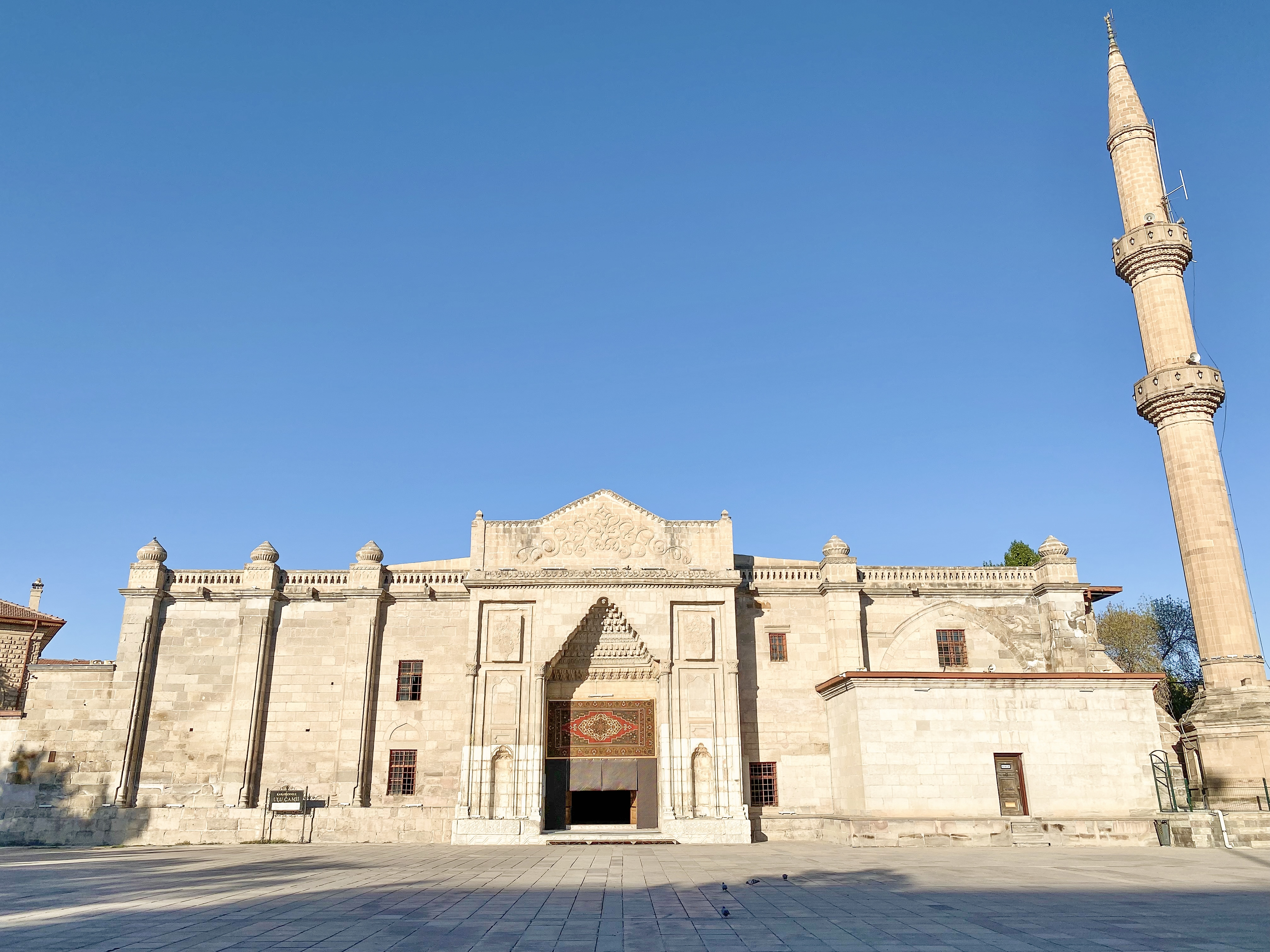

- Location of the mosque in Turkey

Religion
- Affiliation: Islam

Location
- Location: Aksaray, Turkey
- Interactive map of Aksaray Grand Mosque
- Coordinates: 38°22′23.9″N 34°01′45.1″E

Architecture
- Architect: Mehmet Firuz Bey
- Type: Mosque
- Style: Islamic, Ottoman architecture, Seljuk architecture
- Groundbreaking: 1408
- Completed: 1409; 617 years ago
- Minaret: 1

The Aksaray Grand Mosque, also known as the Ulu Mosque, is the mosque located in the city center of Aksaray. It is also known as the Karamanoğlu Mosque. It was commissioned by Mehmet I of Karaman and built between 1408 and 1409.

== History ==
The Aksaray Grand Mosque was built by the Anatolian Seljuks in 1408-1409 and commissioned by Mehmet I of Karaman. Floor mosaics dating back to the Byzantine period were discovered underneath the Grand Mosque during the construction of the minaret. Although not officially confirmed, it is speculated that the Aksaray Grand Mosque stands on the much older settlement of a former temple or church or place of worship. It is believed that the temple was built on or next to a Byzantine palace with mosaics. Nearby the mosque was the historical Roman sarcophagus.

== Gallery ==
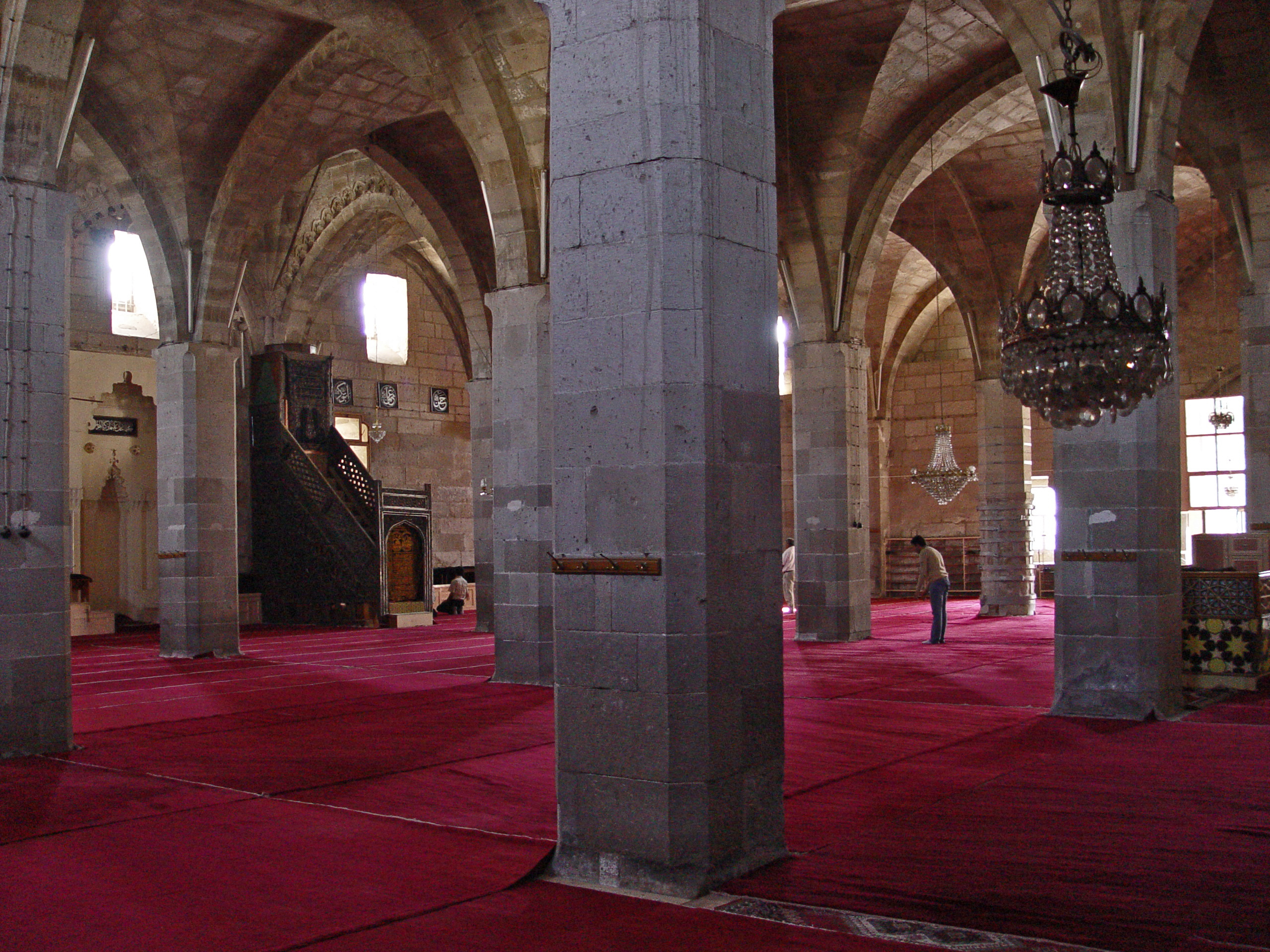
Interior of the Aksaray Grand Mosque

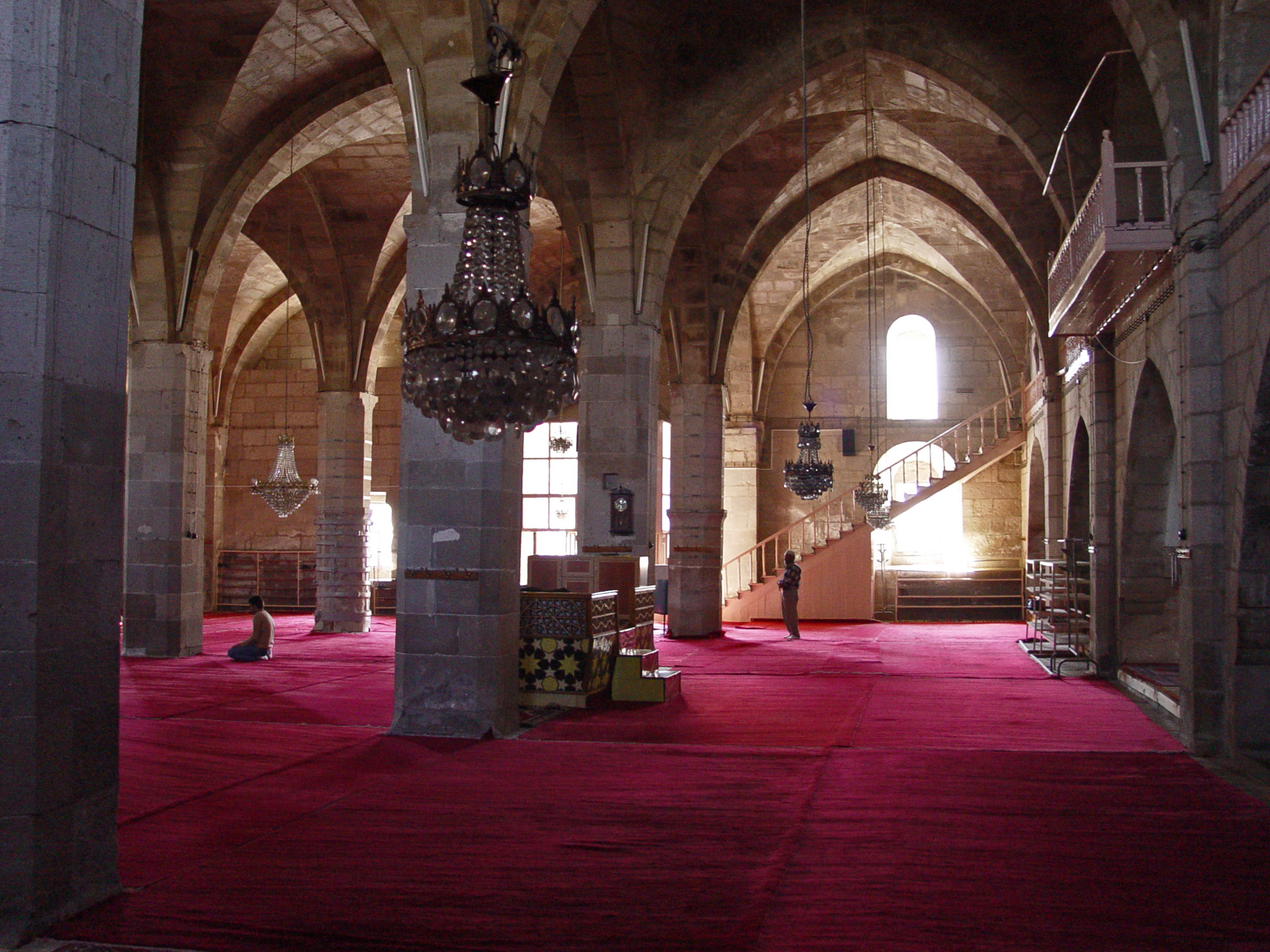
Interior of the Aksaray Grand Mosque

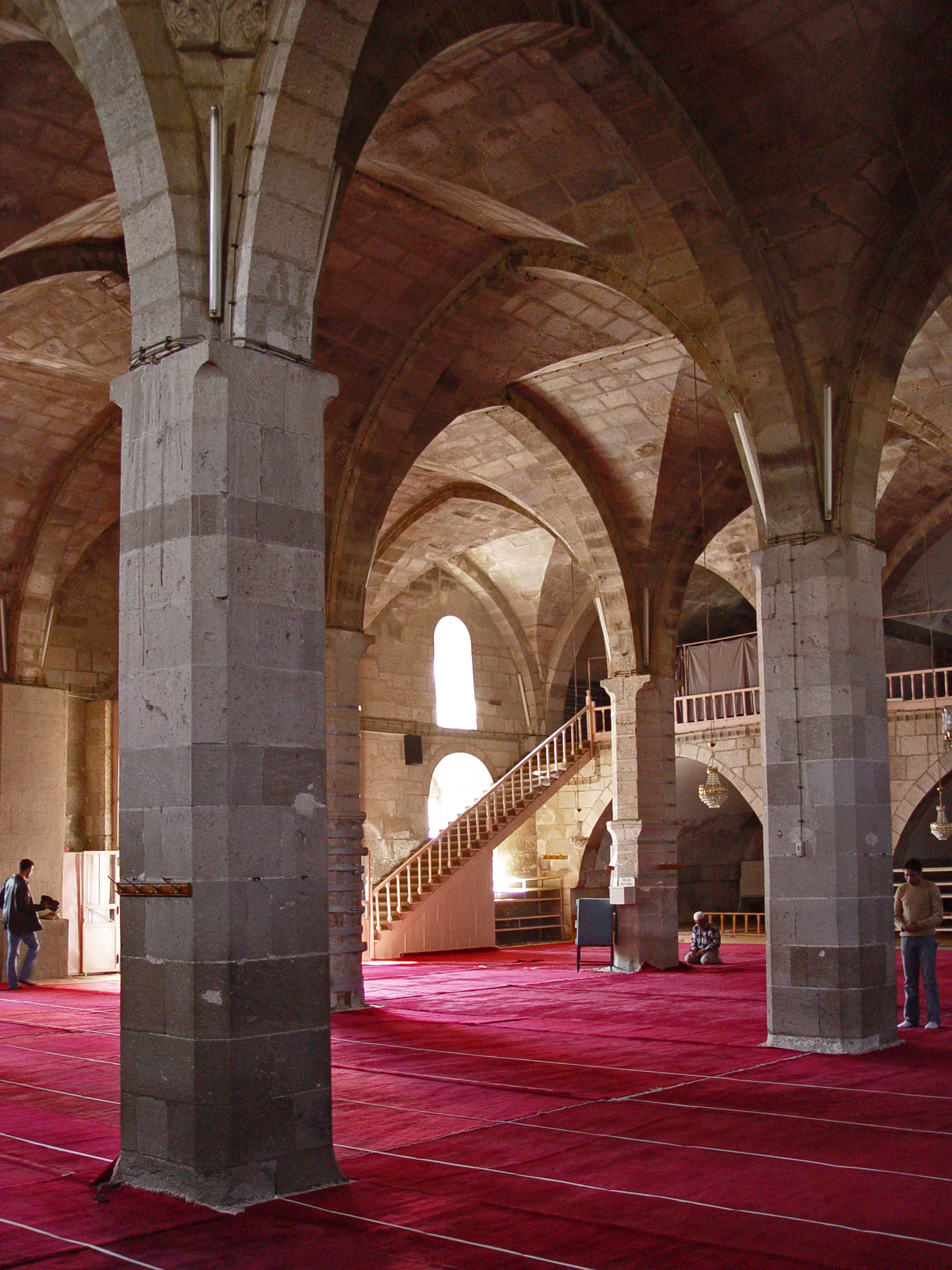
Interior of the Aksaray Grand Mosque

== Sources ==
- Investıgatıon of Archıtectural of Aksaray Grand Mosque and Structural Deterıoratıon Factors
- Turkish Ministry of Culture and Tourism. "General information on Aksaray Grand Mosque" (in Turkish). Archived from the original on 2022-10-02.
- Argun Konuk. "General information on Aksaray Grand Mosque". Archived from the original on 2022-01-29.
- District governor's official website (in Turkish, English, and French)
