= Red Minaret Mosque =

- Kızıl Minare Camii
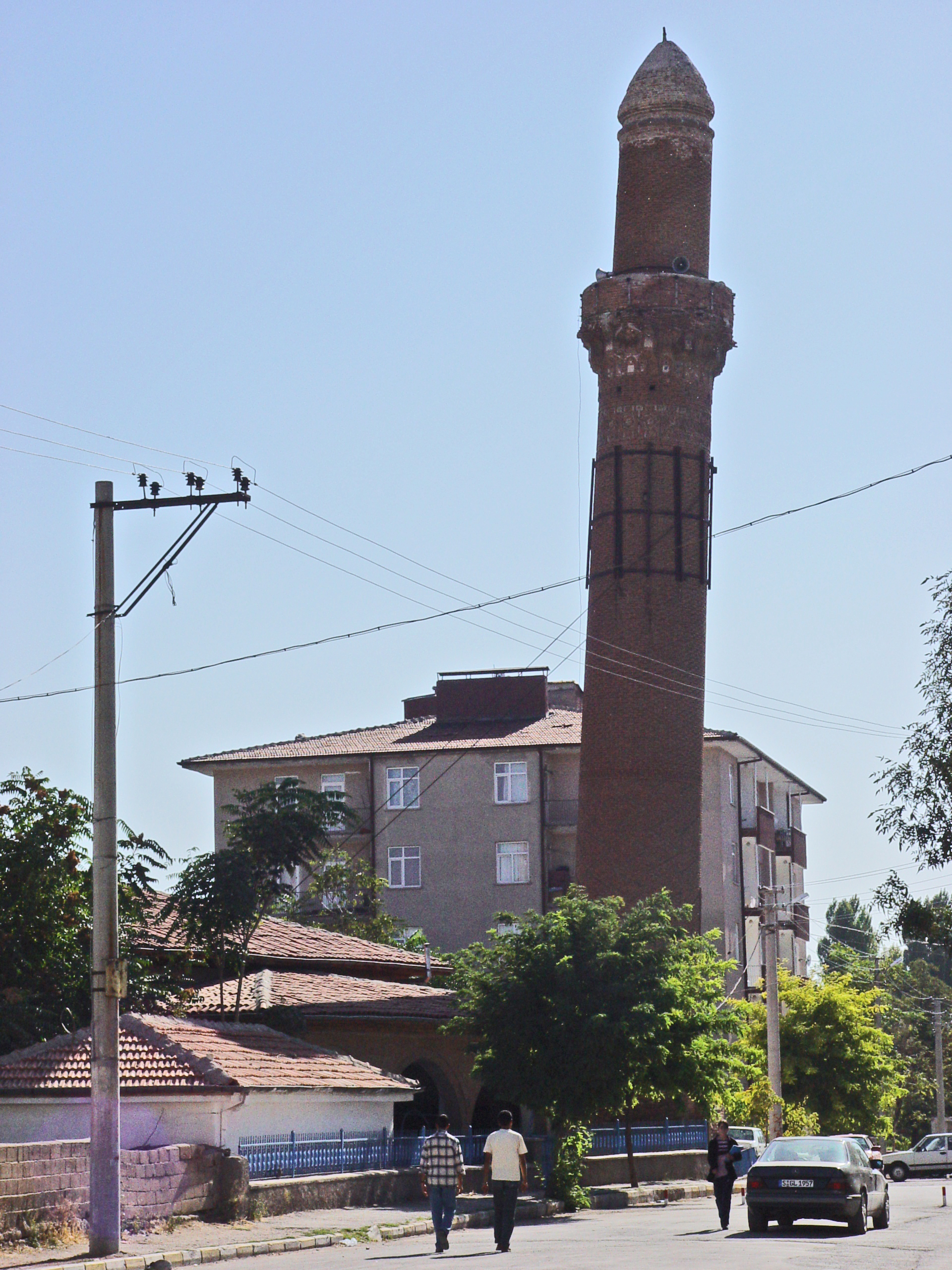

- Location of the mosque in Turkey

Religion
- Affiliation: Islam

Location
- Location: Aksaray, Turkey
- Interactive map of Red Minaret Mosque
- Coordinates: 38°22′36.8″N 34°01′45.8″E

Architecture
- Type: Mosque
- Style: Seljuk
- Groundbreaking: 1221
- Completed: 1236; 790 years ago

Specifications
- Minaret: 1
- Materials: Red brick

The Red Minaret Mosque, sometimes called the Leaning Minaret, or Eğri Minaret, is located in the city center of Aksaray. It belongs to the Seljuk period, and between the years 1221-1237 I. It was built during the reign of Alaeddin Keykubad. It is known as the "Red Minaret" because it is made of red brick.

The cylindrical body, which is seated on a square base, is divided into two parts with a thin molding, the lower part is covered with zigzag and the upper part is covered with blue and green tile mosaics. Since the minaret was in danger of collapse, it was tied with steel ropes in 1973. The mosque next to it was built later.

== History ==
The Red Minaret Mosque belongs to the period of the Anatolian Seljuks, and was built and commissioned in the years 1221-1237 during the reign of Alaeddin Keykubad. It lies in the city center of Aksaray. It is known as the "Red Minaret" because of the red brick used to make it.

== Gallery ==
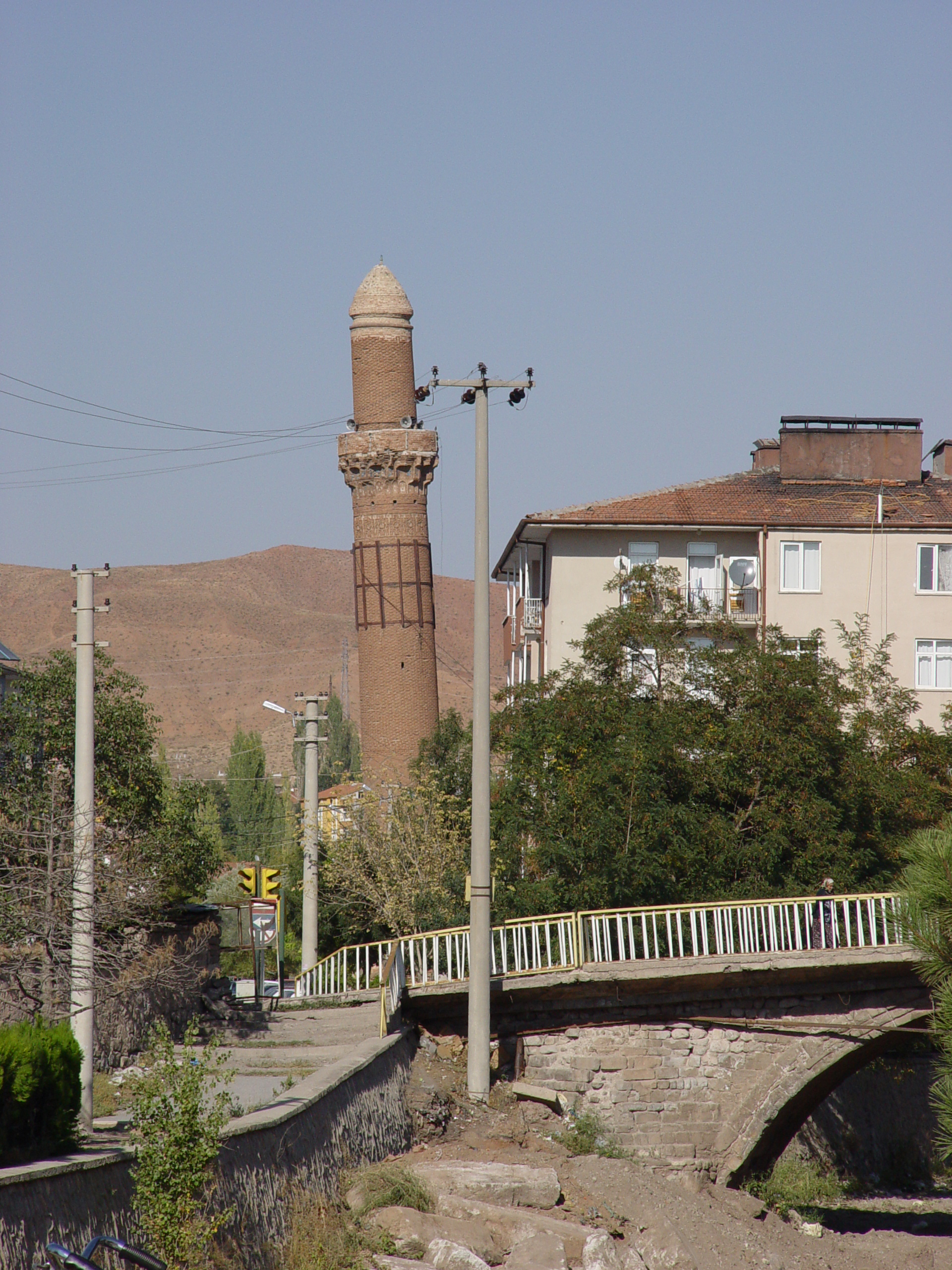
The Leaning Minaret seen from afar

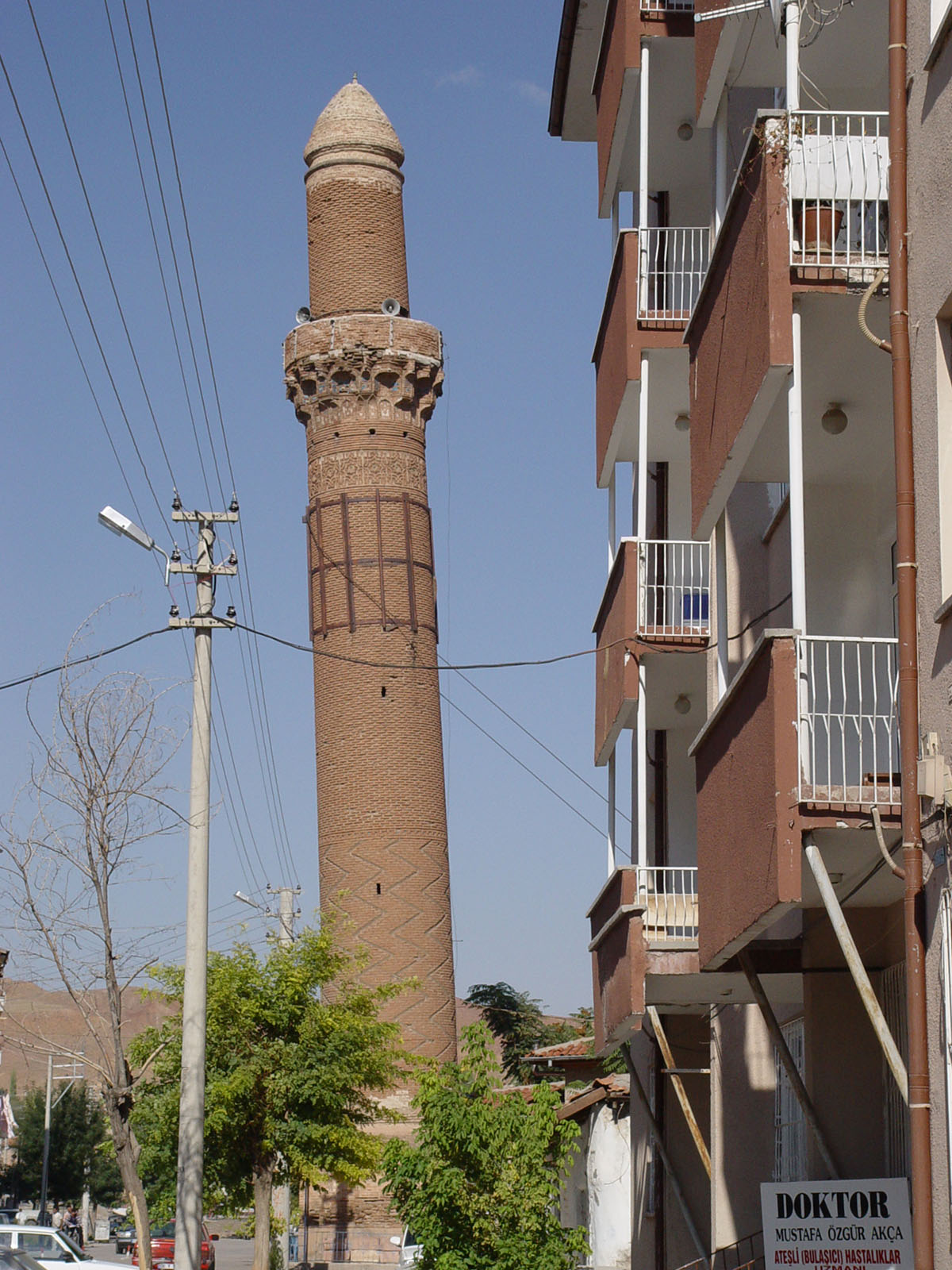
The Leaning Minaret seen from a street
