= Aksaray =

- Municipality
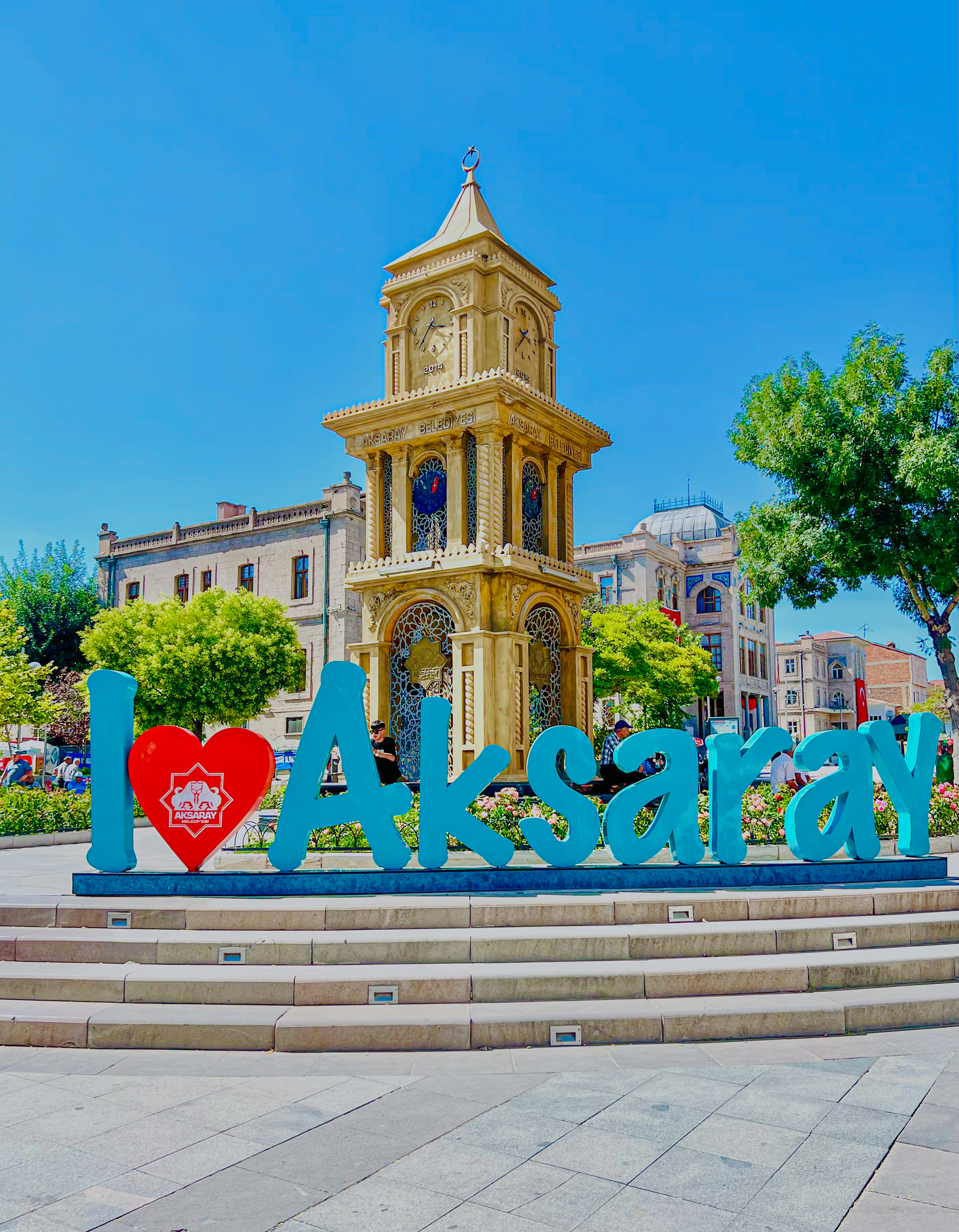
- Clock Tower in Aksaray Square

- Location within Turkey Location within Turkey Central Anatolia
- Coordinates: 38°22′27″N 34°01′44″E
- Country: Turkey
- Province: Aksaray
- District: Aksaray

Government
  - Mayor: Evren Dinçer (AK Party)
- Elevation: 980 m (3,220 ft)
- Population (2025): 327.575
- Time zone: UTC+3 (TRT)
- Postal code: 68100
- Area code: 0382
- Website: www.aksaray.bel.tr

Aksaray (pronounced [ˈaksaɾaj]) is a city in the Central Anatolia region of Turkey. It is the seat of Aksaray Province and Aksaray District. Its population is 247,147 (2021). In 2021 the province had an estimated population of 429,069 distributed over about 7,659 km^{2} (2,957 mi^{2}). The average elevation is 980 m (3,215 ft), with the highest point being Mt. Hasan (Turkish: Hasan Dağı) at 3,268 m (10,722 ft).

The city of Aksaray has a long history and was an important stopover point on the Silk Road that transited Anatolia for centuries. It is a mid-sized city with the Melendiz river running through it and several monuments dating back to the pre-Ottoman era as well as some impressive examples of government buildings from the early Turkish Republic that are gathered around the main square.

The nearest airport is Kapadokya Nevşehir Airport (NAV) which is 62.1 km away from the city.

== Etymology ==
In antiquity the area was named Archelais Garsaura, which was mutated to Taksara during the Seljuk Turkish era, and then to Aksaray. Aksaray means "White Palace" in Turkish.

== History ==
=== Hittite period ===
First mentioned as Šinaḫuttum-Šinuhtu in ancient Hittite texts, and later Nenaşşa, (also spelled as Nenessa and Nenossós in Ancient Greek texts) and Kurşaura.

=== Iron Age ===
==== Šinuḫtu Kingdom ====
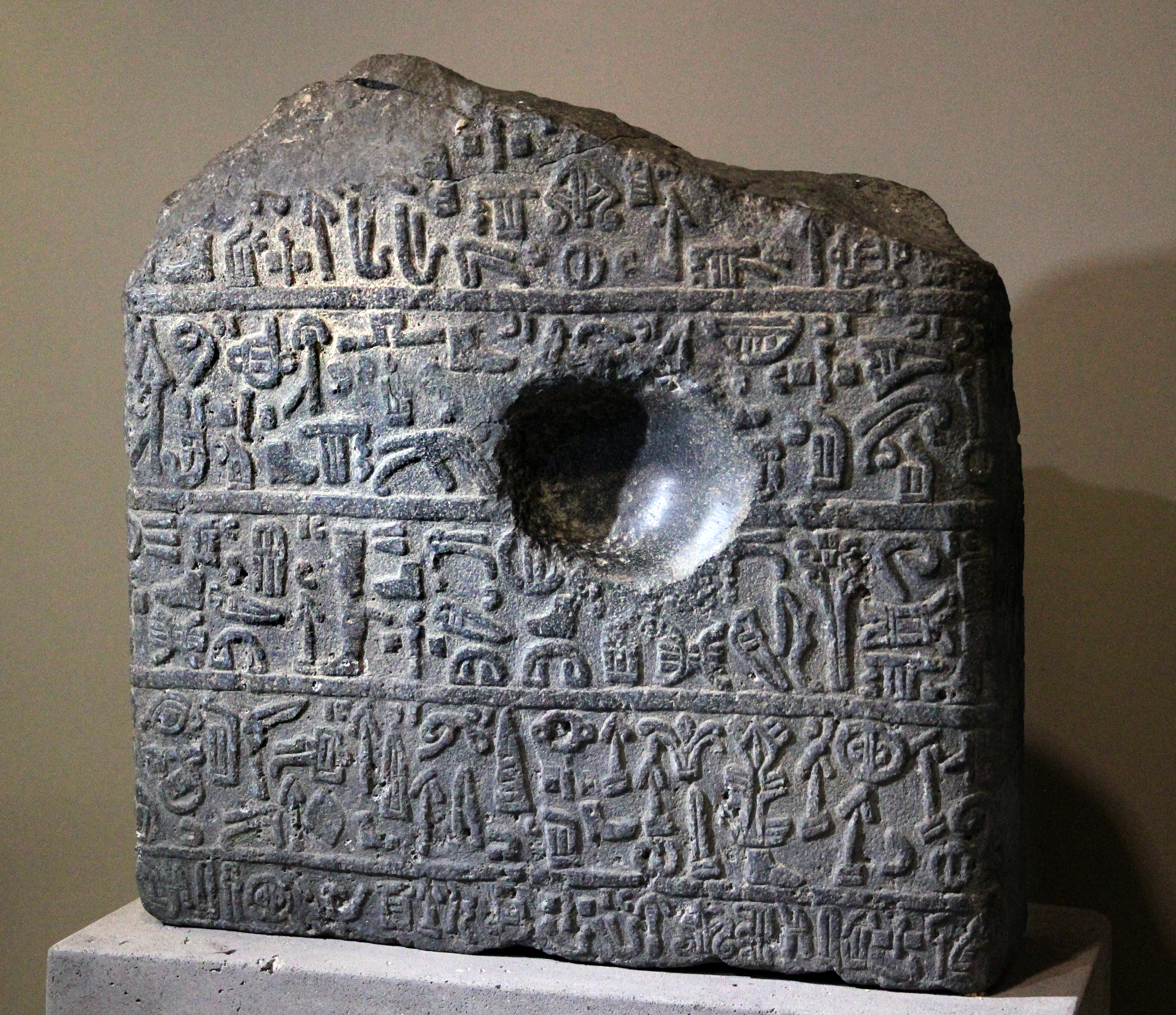
The Aksaray stele, a Syro-Hittite stele in Aksaray Museum.

The Aksaray Stela was written in Luwian Hieroglyphs and was dedicated by king Kiyakiyas who described his prosperity in his reign and the benevolence of the weather god Tarhunzas. Kiyakiyas may be identical with king Kiyakki of Šinuḫtu, who ruled prior to 718 BC. At that time Šinuḫtu was taken, the king was seized and deported by the Neo-Assyrian king Sargon II.

The Hittite name Kurşaura underwent a sound change to Garsaura. The /k/ became voiced and turned into a /g/ consonant, while the /u/ became /a/. Strabon mentions Garsaura in his work (V/4 and VI/1).

=== Classical period ===
The town of Garsaura was renamed Archelaïs (Greek: Ἀρχελαΐς) by Archelaus of Cappadocia, the last Cappadocian king. In Roman times, the town was known as Colonia and became a bishropric.

Of its bishops, Euphrasius was at the First Council of Nicaea in 325; Bosporus (who is mentioned in the correspondence of Basil the Great and Gregory of Nazianzus) at the First Council of Constantinople in 381; Daniel at the Council of Ephesus in 431; Aristomachus (who was also a signatory of the letter of the bishops of the Roman province of Cappadocia Tertia, to which Colonia belonged, to Byzantine Emperor Leo I the Thracian about the killing of Proterius of Alexandria in 458) at the Council of Chalcedon in 451; Alexander at a council in Constantinople called by Patriarch Menas of Constantinople in 536; and Conon at the Trullan Council of 692. No longer a residential bishopric, Colonia in Cappadocia is today listed by the Catholic Church as a titular see. Colonia is also a titular Turkish metropolis of the Ecumenical Patriarchate of Constantinople.

=== Middle Ages ===
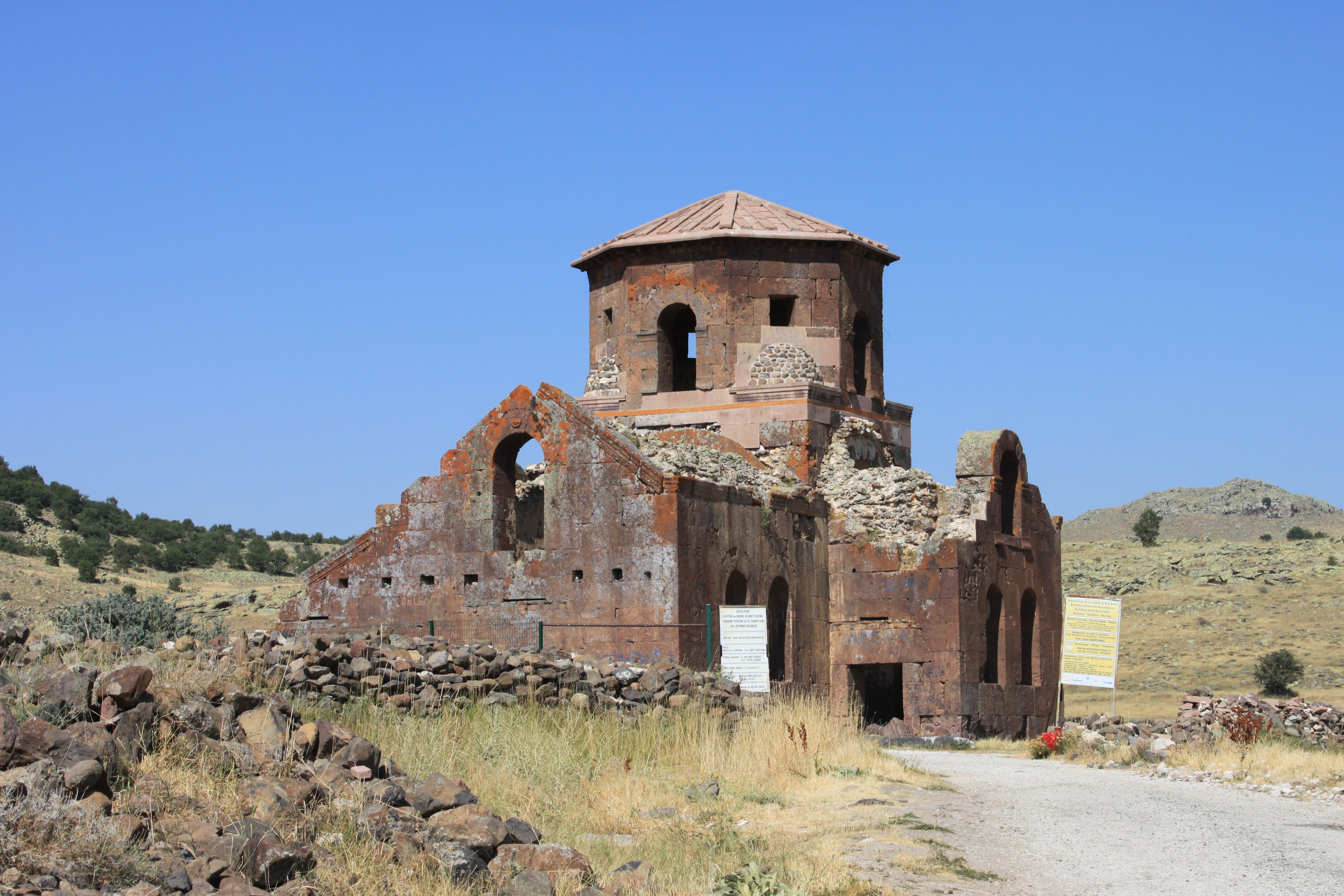
Kizil Kilise (“Red Church”), formerly known as St. Spyridon Church near Güzelyurt.

During Byzantine times, the town was known as Koloneia (Κολώνεια) was an important military center, holding an imperial aplekton.

At some point between 1081 and 1084, the town was part of the domain of Suleiman ibn Qutalmish according to Ibn al-Athīr. This would later become the Sultanate of Rum and the Sultans founded and left important landmarks in and around the town. Its name also changed over time to Taksará and Aksará, which is a rendering of Garsáoura. The Moroccan traveller Ibn Battuta, who visited the region in the 14th century, was impressed by the class of Muslim traders that had emerged in Aksaray and noted the urban centre as "a beautiful city, surrounded by waterways and gardens, with a water supply coming right to the houses of the city." The city was raided by the Mongols in 1277 and they killed or enslaved 6,000 of its residents.

=== Ottoman Empire ===
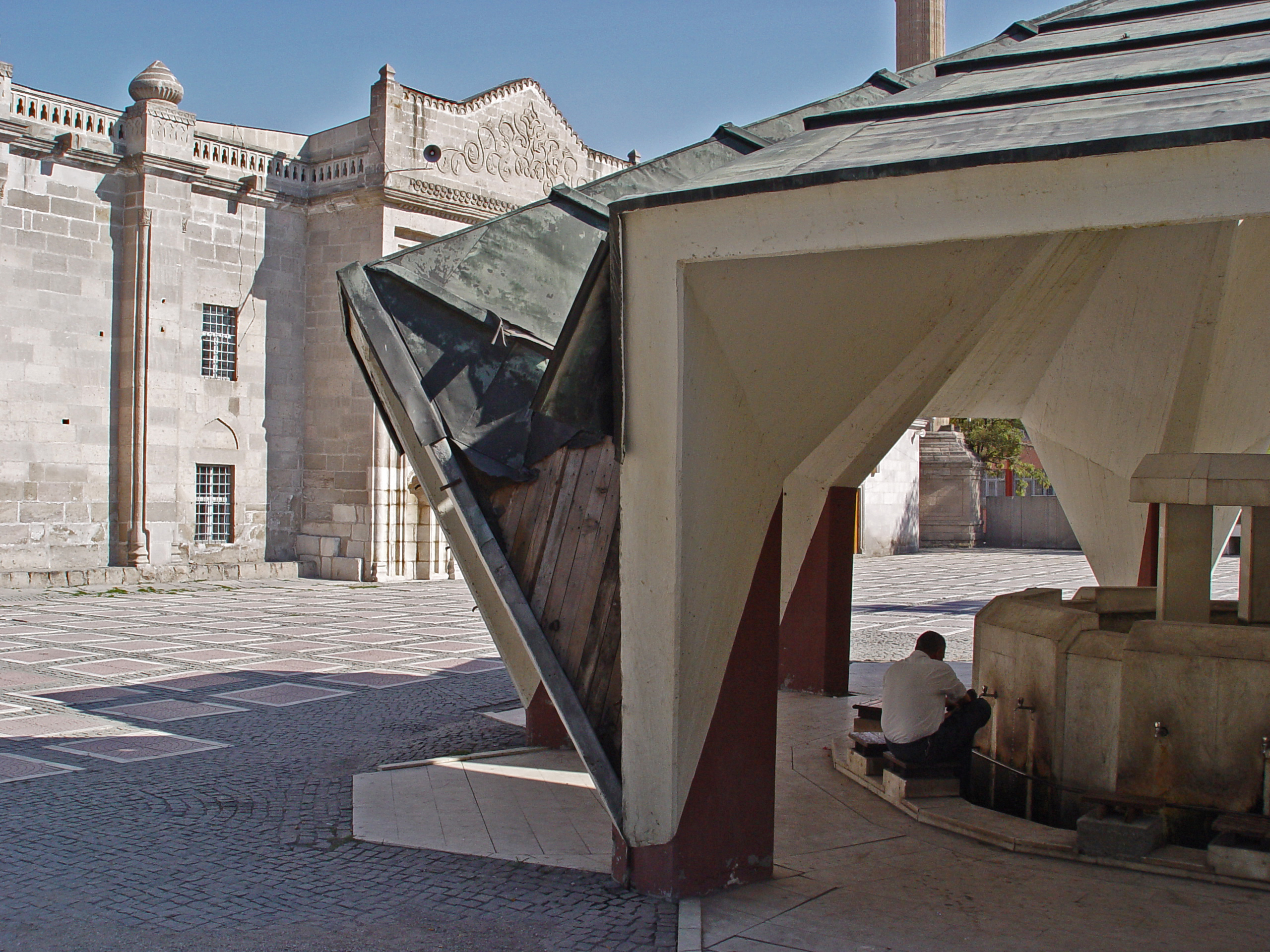
The Aksaray Grand Mosque in Aksaray city centre, built during the reign of the Karamanids.

In 1470 Aksaray was incorporated into the Ottoman Empire by İshak Pasha after a protracted struggle against the Karamanids. Many inhabitants of the city were relocated to Constantinople (recently captured by the Ottomans) where they were settled in a part of the city that also came to be named Aksaray.

During Ottoman times, the town was prosperous in part because of its proximity to Tuz Gölü (Lake Tuz), which was a primary source of salt for Anatolia.

== Attractions ==
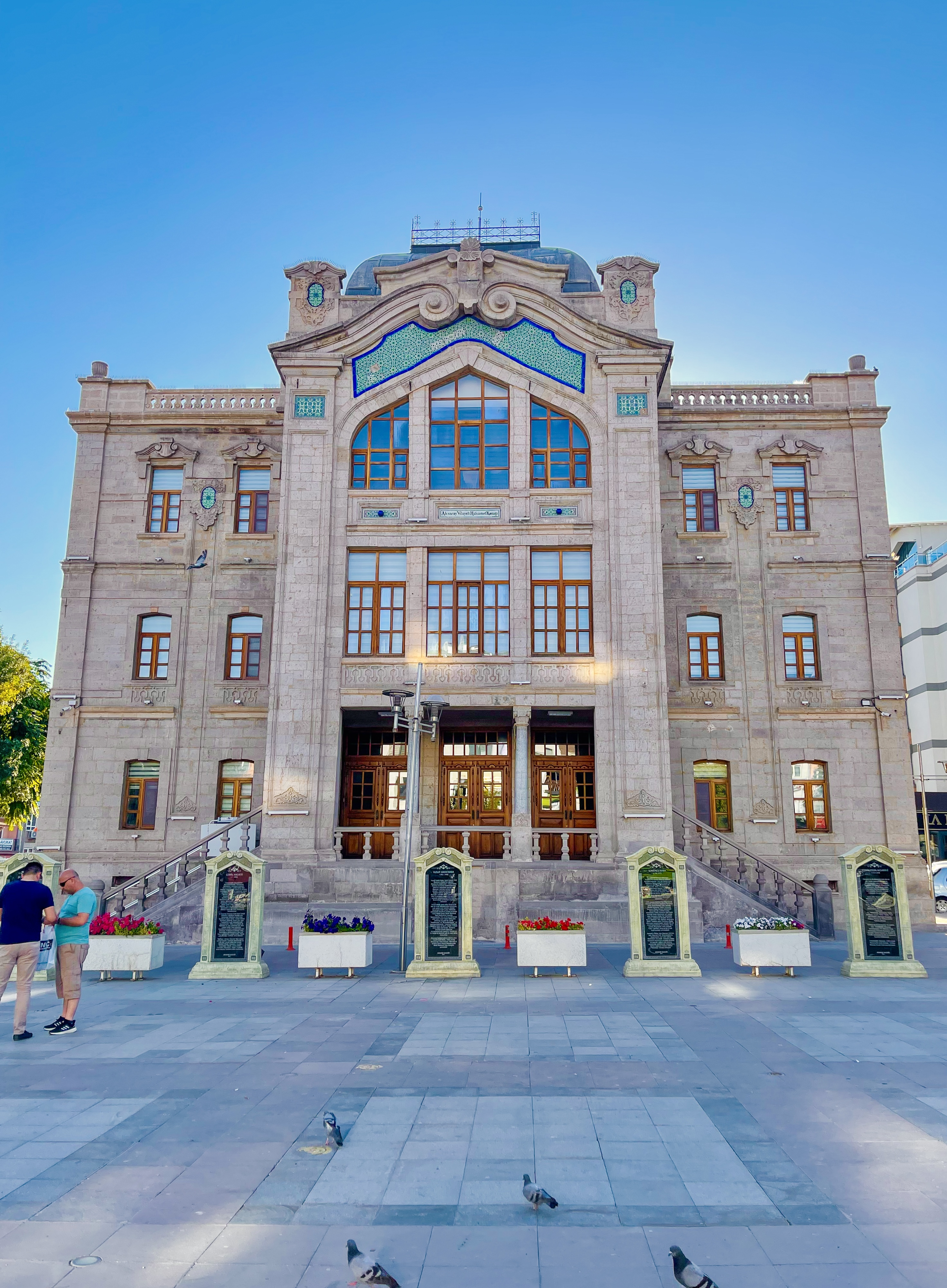
Aksaray Provincial Government House is one of a trio of examples of the First National Architectural movement in Aksaray square.

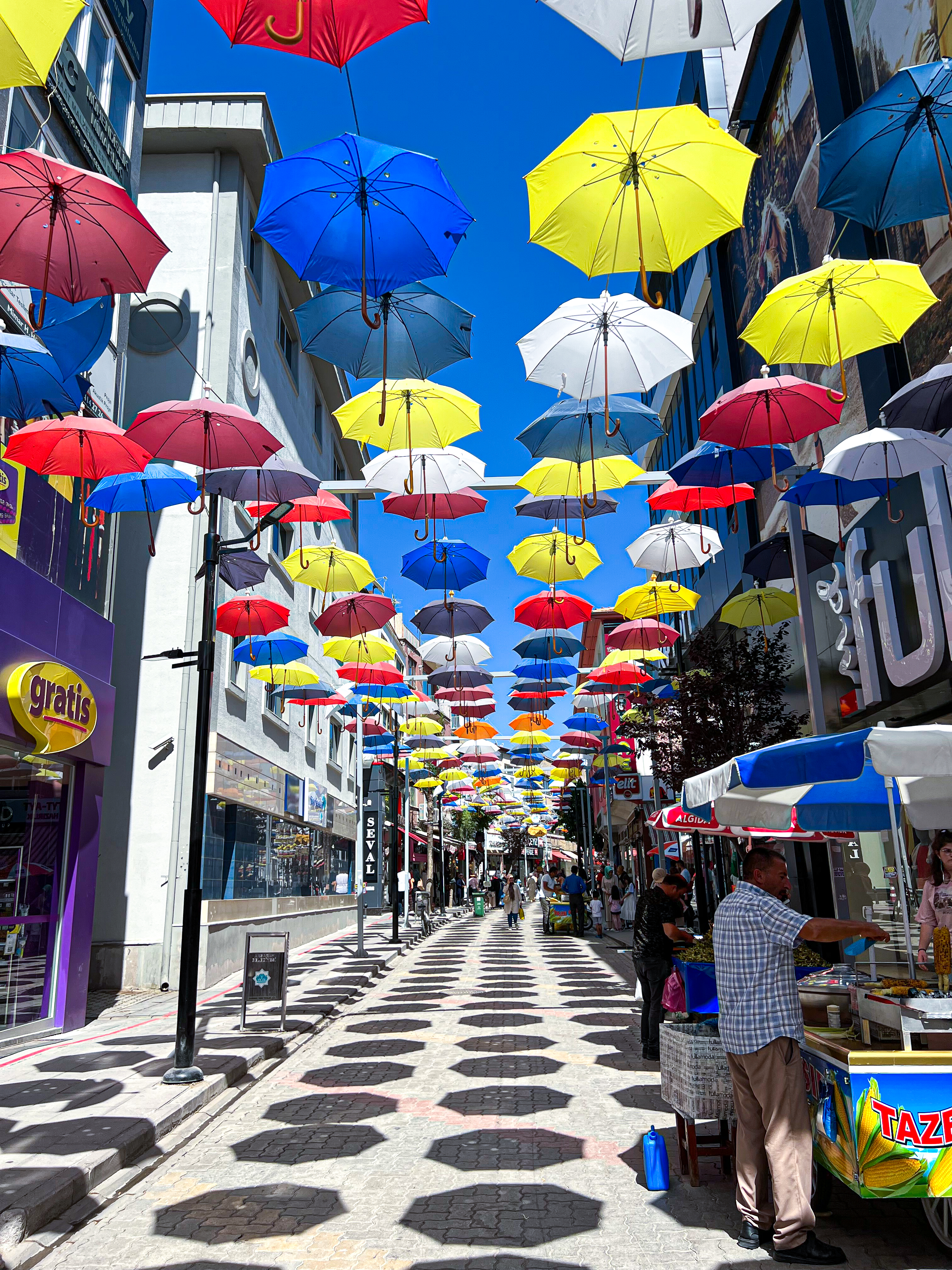
The Umbrella Street, better known as "Şemsiyeli Sokak" is a popular attraction in Aksaray.

=== In Aksaray ===
The Aksaray Grand Mosque, also known as the Karamanoğlu Camii or Ulu Camii, is a large mosque right in the city centre dating back to 1408-09 and the Karamanoğlu dynasty. It has a detached minaret erected in 1925.

The Red Minaret Mosque, also known as the Eğri Minare Mosque, (Leaning Minaret Mosque) has a Seljuk Turkish minaret dating back to 1236 and the reign of Aläettin Keykubat.

The Luna Park, also known as Kültürpark is a large amusement theme park in the city centre of Aksaray.

The Zincirye Medresesi (Chained School) was a Koranic school with a typical soaring and elaborate Seljuk portal. It was built by the bey of Karaman in 1345 and is now used as the local library.

The Kurşunlu Mosque, also known as the Kurşunlu Camii, and formerly the Hacı Bektaş Mosque, is a mosque in the city center of Aksaray. It is believed to have been built in 1325 by the Seljuks.

The Hakiki Yusuf Baba complex, also known as Somunca Baba Complex, contains the tombs of the 14th-century Islamic leader Somuncu Baba and the scholar Cemaleddin'i Aksaray.

The Kapalı Çarşı, meaning "Covered Market" is a Grand Bazaar in the city centre of Aksaray.

The Aksaray Observation Deck is an observation deck overlooking the city of Aksaray.

The Azmi Milli Museum, also known as the Azm-i Milli T.A.Ş. Un Fabrikası, is a historic stone building built in the 1930s on the commands of Mustafa Kemal Atatürk. It sits adjacent to the Zincirye Medresesi. It currently operates as a museum.

The Paşa Hamam, an Ottoman-era Turkish hamam built by Hacı Ali Pasha.

The Kılıçaslan Hamam, a recently restored Turkish hamam in the city centre.

The Aksaray Highschool, or Aksaray Lisesi, is the location of the former Roman thermae or bathhouse.

A newer attraction is Hünkarland, a large theme park with artificial waterfalls, which is a popular venue for Aksaray wedding parties.

=== Around Aksaray ===
Hasan Dağı is a 3,000m volcano between Aksaray and Niğde, visible from the city. The (presumed) ancient Roman and Byzantine city of Nora, in the village of Helvadere, is on the slopes of Mt Hasan, in close proximity to Aksaray.

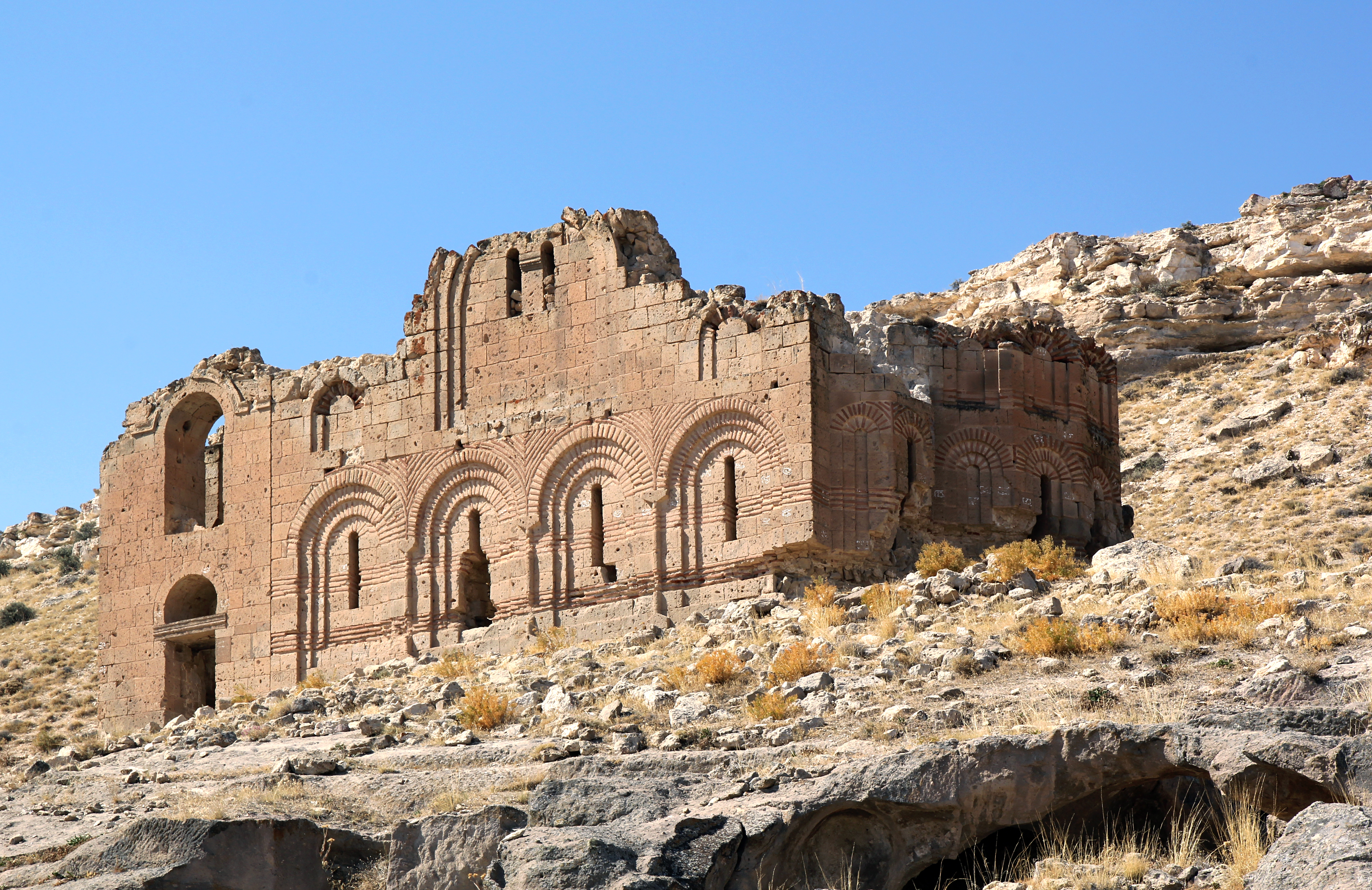
Çanlı Kilise ('Bell Church"), southeast of Aksaray city.

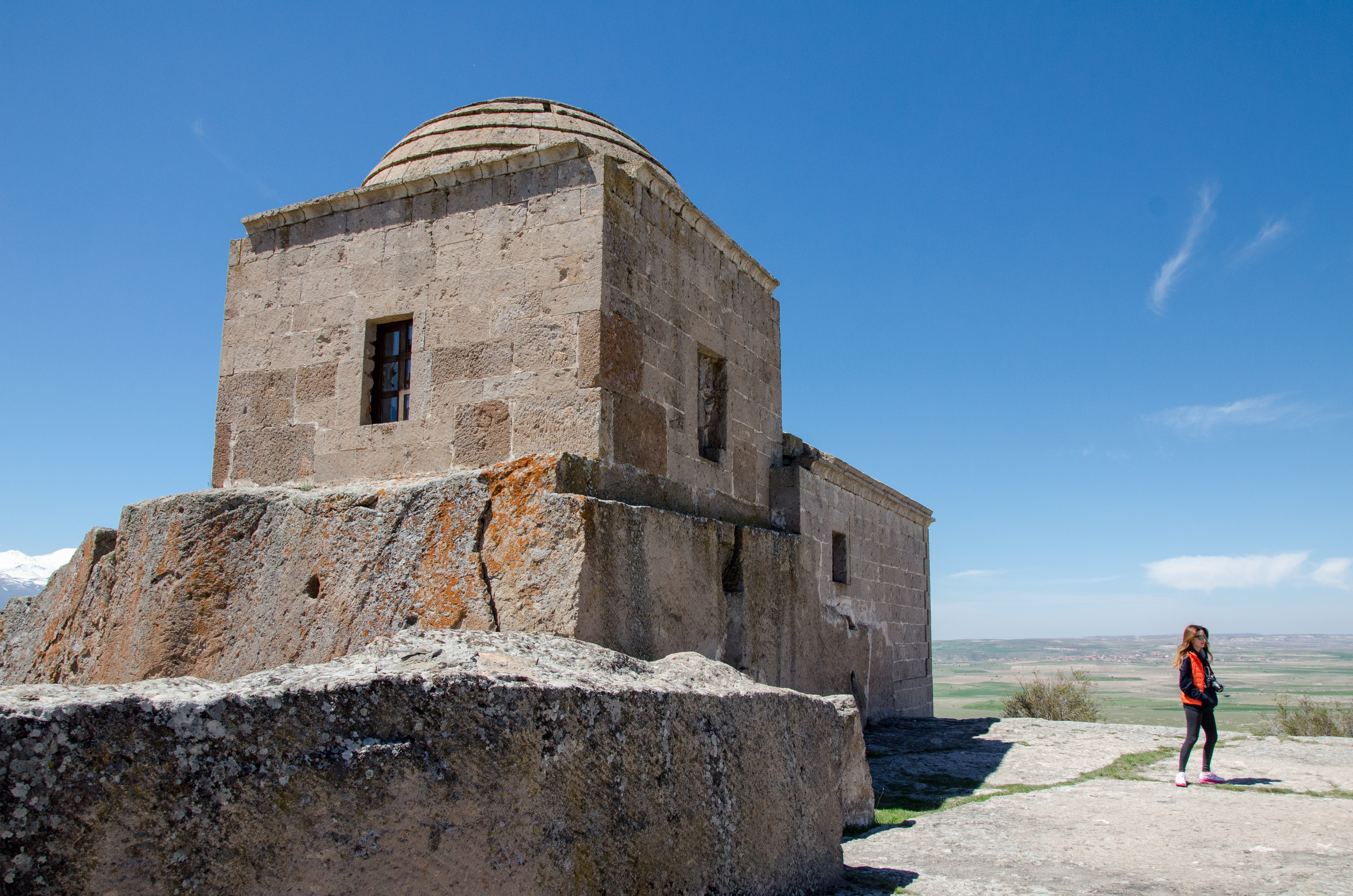
St. Analipsis Church, also known as the "High Church" (Yüksek Kilise).

The area around the city also contains several höyüks. Aşıklı Höyük is a burial mound 25 km (16 mi) east of the city. Acemhöyük is an early Bronze Age settlement, 18 km (11 mi) north-west of the city.

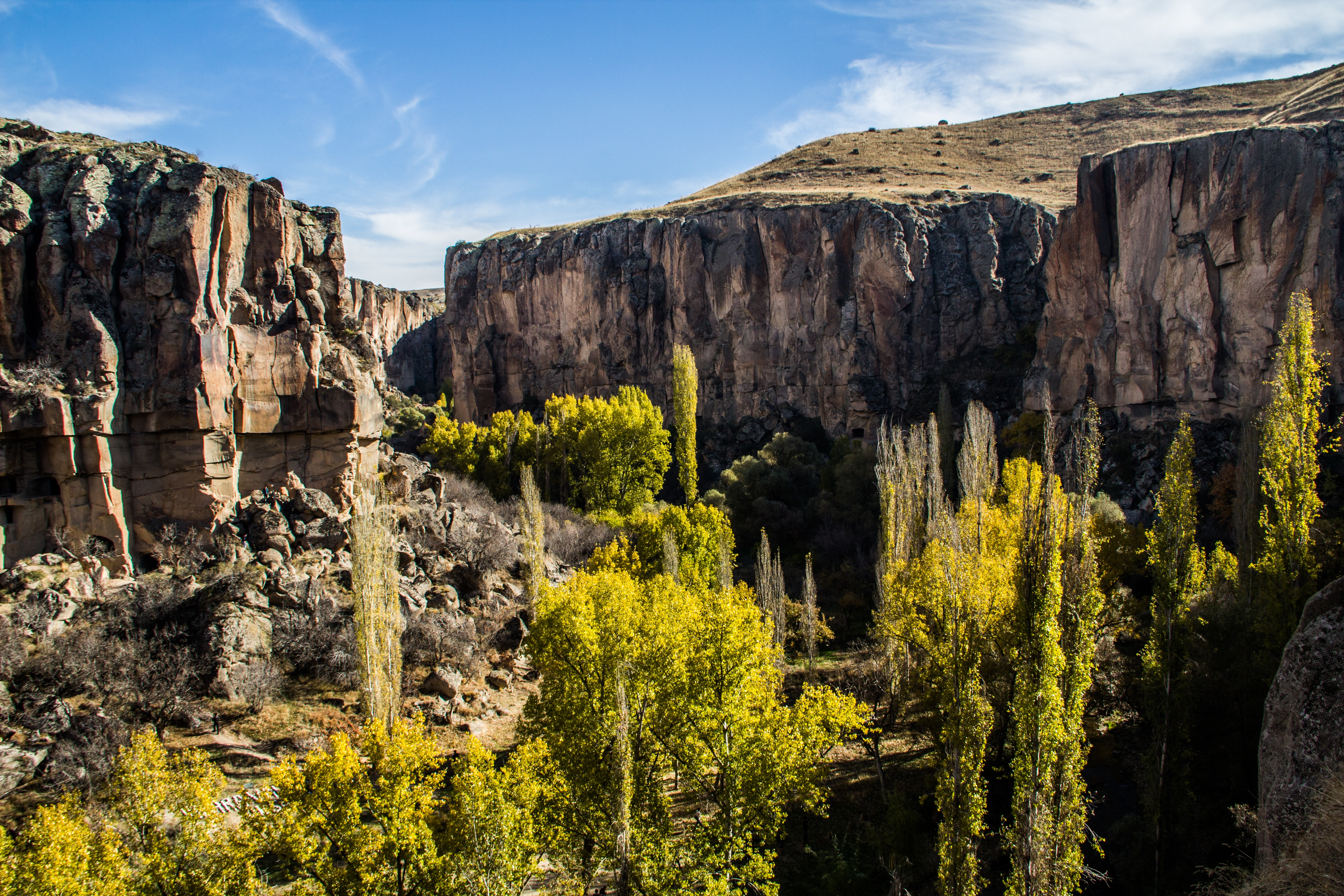
The Ihlara Valley is a popular tourism destination.

The dramatic Ihlara Canyon, 40 km (25 mi) southeast of the city, was carved out by the Melendiz river and its walls are riddled with Byzantine frescoed churches dating back to the early Middle Ages. It runs from Selime village in the north to Ihlara township in the south and is a popular destination for tour groups visiting Cappadocia.

Near Ihlara, Güzelyurt is a Cappadocian town with rock-cut churches and a rock-cut mosque, as well as many fine stone houses from the 19th century. Nearby are the remains of the Red Church (Kızıl Kilise) and the High Church (Yüksek Kilise).

==== Caravanserais ====
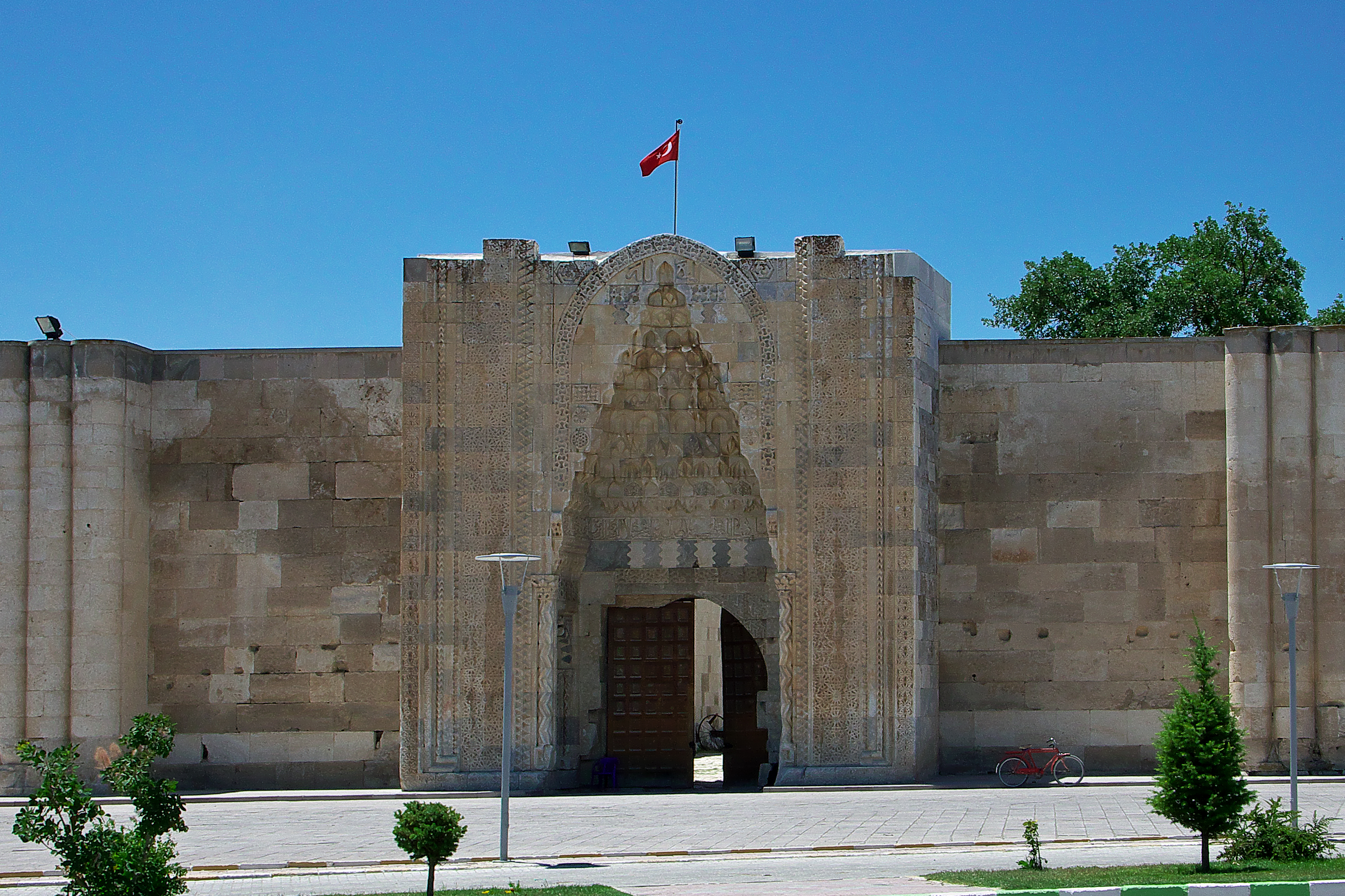
Monumental entrance of the Sultan Han

Several monumental caravanserais straddle the trade route linking Konya to Aksaray that once continued to Persia (the Uzun Yolu). The best known and most impressive is Sultan Han, located in Sultanhan village about 40 km (25 mi) west of Aksaray. A date on this fortified structure indicates that it was built in 1229, during the reign of the Seljuk Sultan Kayqubad I, by the Syrian architect Mohammed Bin Havlan El Dimaski (the word Dimasci indicating Damascus) . After it was partially destroyed by a fire, it was restored and extended in 1278 by the governor Seraceddin Ahmed Kerimeddin bin El Hasan during the reign of Sultan Kaykhusraw III. It was then the largest caravanserai in Turkey. Today, it is one of the best surviving examples of Anatolian Seljuk architecture.

The monumental entrance to the han is on the east side and is a 13m-high marble portal (pishtaq) projecting from the 50m wide front wall. The gate is enclosed by a pointed arch decorated with muqarnas and elegant geometric patterns. The open courtyard (44 x 58 m) was lined with arcades with stables beneath the accommodation. Outdoor areas were used in the summer, while the covered rooms (iwans) on either side were used during the winter. In the middle of the courtyard stands a square stone kiosk-mosque (kösk mesçidi), the oldest example in Turkey. The mosque on the second floor sits on a construction of four carved barrel-vaulted arches.

At the other side of the courtyard is another equally decorative arched entrance with muqarnas, joggled voussoirs and interlocking geometric designs. It leads into a stable covered with a barrel vault with transverse ribs. A short tower, capped by a dome, stands over the crossing area. This dome has an oculus, providing light and air to the stable.

== Aksaray Museum ==
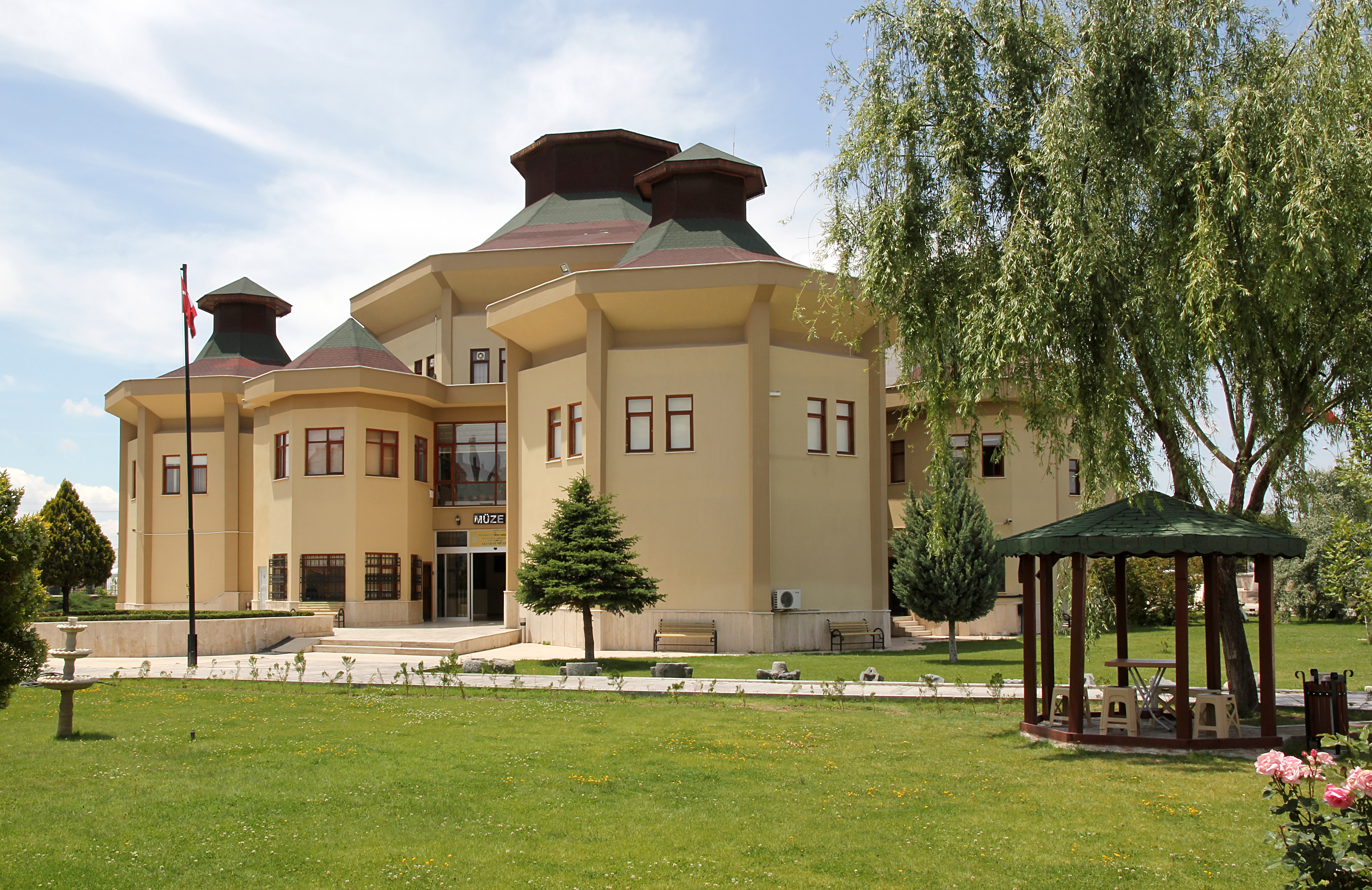
Aksaray Museum.

Aksaray Museum exhibits the Aksaray Stele, a Late Hittite monument discovered in the city in 1976. The stone block is 88 cm high, and 90 cm wide but the top half is missing. It portrays a weather god, facing right and wearing pointed shoes. On the reverse are the last five lines of a text in Luwian hieroglyphs including a dedication by King Kiyakiya who describes the prosperity of his reign and the benevolence of the weather god Tarhunzas. Kiyakiya is believed to be the same as King Kiakki of Šinuḫtu, who is mentioned in Assyrian texts and ruled in 718 BC. He was then deported by the Neo-Assyrian king Sargon II. He is also mentioned in the Topada rock inscription (de:Felsinschrift von Topada) as one of the kings who were allied with Wasusarma of Tabal.

== Aksaray Castle ==
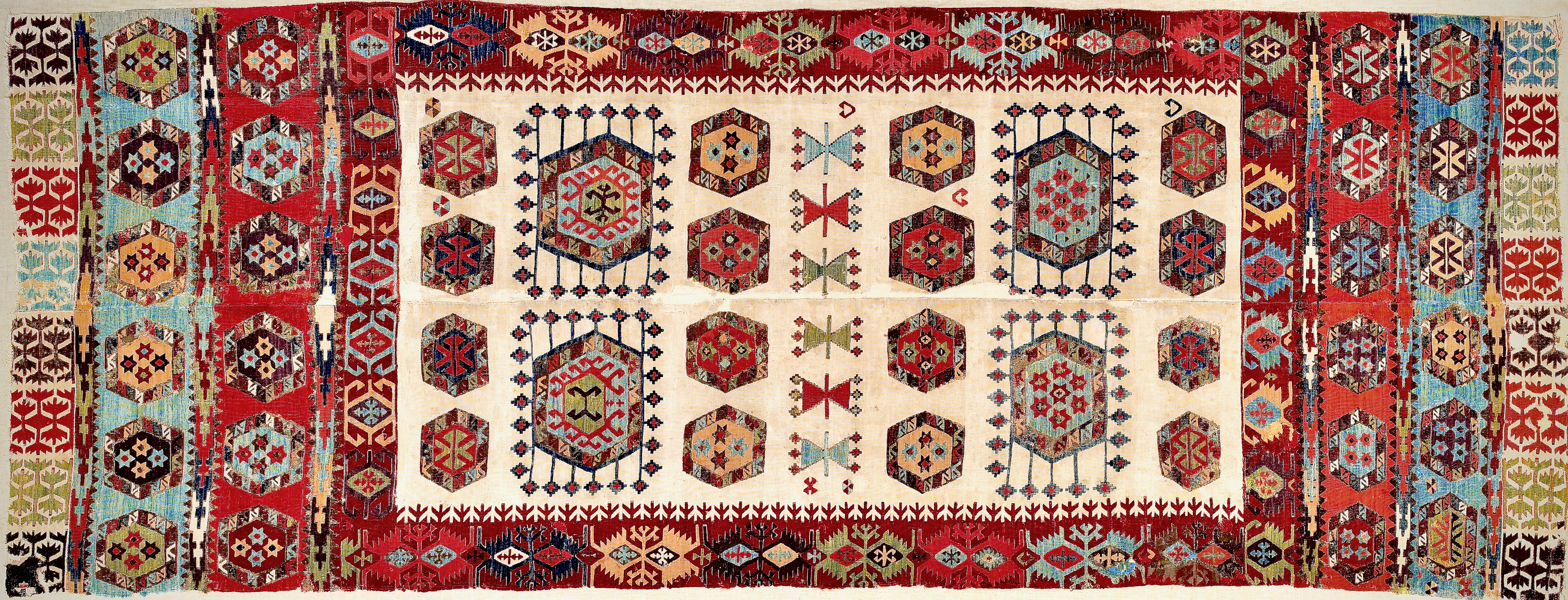
Aksaray kilim, 18th century. Likely made by settled Hotamis Turkmen in the Aksaray region. Size 185 x 100 cm.

the Aksaray Castle was a four-cornered, stone-built, solidly built castle on a large area, on the edge of the Melendiz river. It was built in the middle of the city. The bastion and its towers were not very high. With all their bastions, teeth and bodies, their crenellated holes and their calculated towers always faced each other. During the siege, the strong warriors of each tower guarded the towers with rifles. There were five gates on the side of the fortresses. Küçükkapı faces west. Demirkapı (Sídero Porta) opens to the qibla. Keçikapısı (Gida Porta) also opens towards the qibla. Ereğlikapısı (Herakleia Porta) opens to the south and Konyakapısı (Ikónion Porta) opens to the west. The guards of these gates are the tax collectors. A warehouse was built in the castle to store wheat during the rebels' time. It has no arsenal. There were big balls thrown during Ramadan and other festivals.

The southern interior of the castle is now where Aksaray Square stands. The Kurşunlu Mosque is where Ereğlikapısı used to be. It also encompasses the Aksaray Grand Mosque to the North-East of where the castle once stood. The Zinciriye Medresesi lies at the West entrance of the castle. The existence of the castle dates back to the first ages but was also very prominent during the Middle Ages. The castle existed in Roman and Byzantine times.

== Economy ==
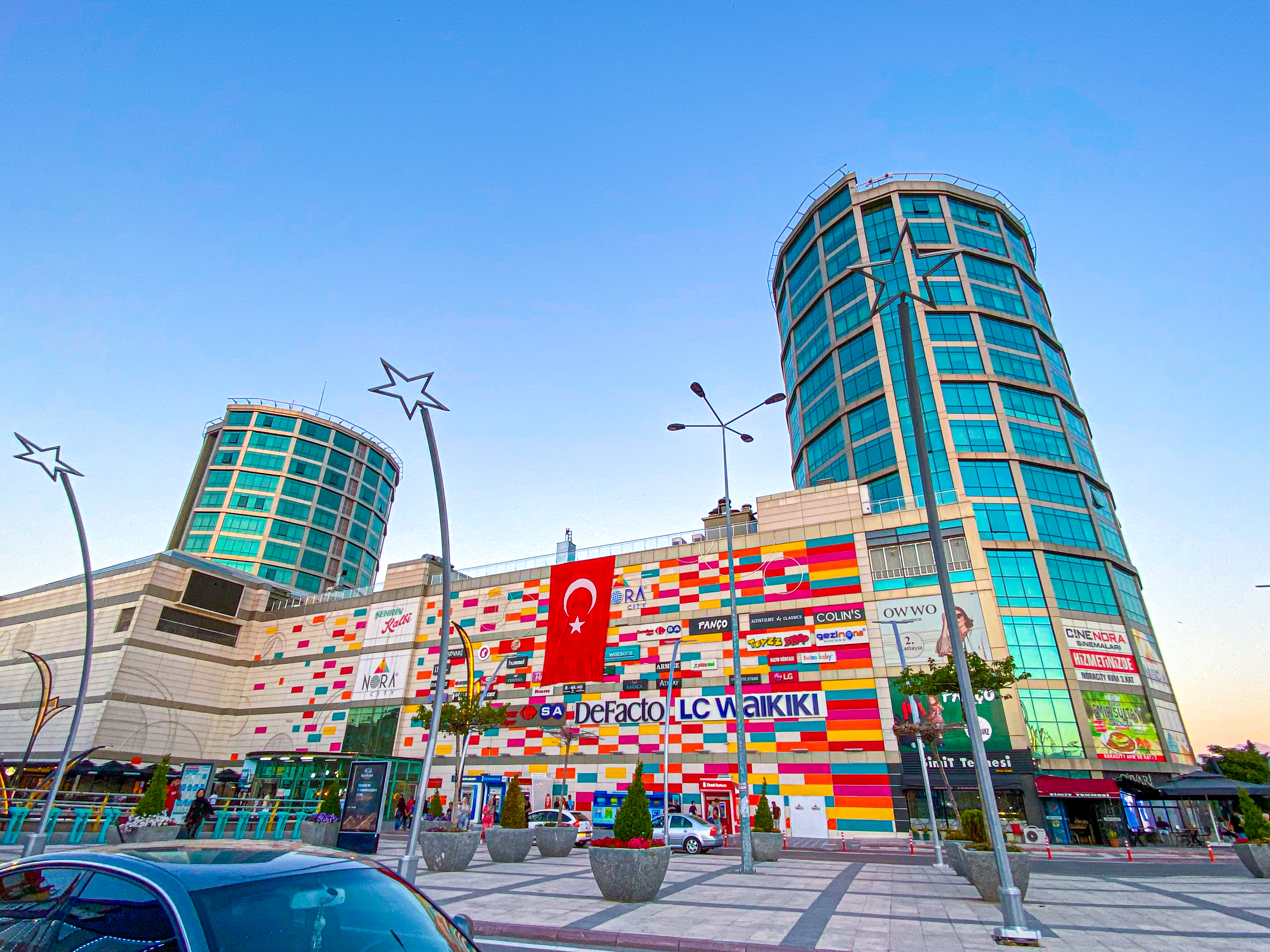
Nora City AVM is a shopping centre in the city of Aksaray

Seventy percent of the local workforce is engaged in agriculture and animal husbandry. Barley, sugar beet, vetch, corn, potatoes, onions, beans, flax, hemp, grapes and apples are the main local crops, with wheat production being most dominant. Carpet and rug weaving were traditionally important, especially in the area around Sultanhanı but these days the weavers mainly focus on repairing and repurposing old carpets. There is also some industry in Aksaray city.

Ihlara Valley and the other tourist attractions of Cappadocia may be nearby but Aksaray has not had much success in attracting visitors to the city itself.

== Climate ==
Aksaray has a cold semi-arid climate (BSk) under the Köppen classification and a hot-summer continental climate (Dca) under the Trewartha classification.

Highest recorded temperature:40.8 °C (105.4 °F) on 15 August 2023
Lowest recorded temperature:−29.0 °C (−20.2 °F) on 7 February 1991

Climate data for Aksaray (1991–2020, extremes 1929–2023) (Elevation: 970m, coordinates:38°22′14″N 33°59′55″E
Month	Jan	Feb	Mar	Apr	May	Jun	Jul	Aug	Sep	Oct	Nov	Dec	Year
Record high °C (°F)	20.4 (68.7)	21.8 (71.2)	29.0 (84.2)	31.8 (89.2)	34.4 (93.9)	36.9 (98.4)	40.0 (104.0)	40.8 (105.4)	38.7 (101.7)	34.5 (94.1)	29.5 (85.1)	22.0 (71.6)	40.8 (105.4)
Mean daily maximum °C (°F)	5.8 (42.4)	8.1 (46.6)	13.3 (55.9)	18.4 (65.1)	23.5 (74.3)	27.7 (81.9)	31.3 (88.3)	31.3 (88.3)	27.2 (81.0)	21.4 (70.5)	13.7 (56.7)	7.7 (45.9)	19.1 (66.4)
Daily mean °C (°F)	0.9 (33.6)	2.6 (36.7)	7.1 (44.8)	11.9 (53.4)	16.7 (62.1)	21.0 (69.8)	24.5 (76.1)	24.4 (75.9)	19.8 (67.6)	14.2 (57.6)	7.4 (45.3)	2.8 (37.0)	12.8 (55.0)
Mean daily minimum °C (°F)	−3.0 (26.6)	−2.0 (28.4)	1.7 (35.1)	6.0 (42.8)	10.3 (50.5)	13.9 (57.0)	17.1 (62.8)	17.0 (62.6)	12.3 (54.1)	7.7 (45.9)	2.1 (35.8)	−1.2 (29.8)	6.8 (44.2)
Record low °C (°F)	−26.4 (−15.5)	−29.0 (−20.2)	−19.0 (−2.2)	−7.5 (18.5)	−0.2 (31.6)	2.9 (37.2)	6.8 (44.2)	5.9 (42.6)	1.0 (33.8)	−6.0 (21.2)	−14.0 (6.8)	−21.9 (−7.4)	−29.0 (−20.2)
Average precipitation mm (inches)	41.7 (1.64)	32.2 (1.27)	39.7 (1.56)	40.4 (1.59)	43.1 (1.70)	24.7 (0.97)	8.2 (0.32)	6.2 (0.24)	12.4 (0.49)	25.9 (1.02)	30.1 (1.19)	44.8 (1.76)	349.4 (13.76)
Average precipitation days	10.57	10.23	10.93	10.23	10.9	5.97	1.53	1.93	2.97	6.3	7.1	10.93	89.59
Average snowy days	6.09	3.27	3.09	0.82	0	0	0	0	0	0	0.91	3.33	17.51
Average relative humidity (%)	69.8	64.4	58	53.4	51.9	47.4	40.5	40.9	43.6	53.3	62	69.5	54.5
Mean monthly sunshine hours	96.7	130.2	173.8	212.2	279.3	324.6	366.8	342.5	278.5	214.9	149.2	92.6	2,661.4
Mean daily sunshine hours	3.1	4.6	5.7	7.1	9.0	10.8	11.9	11.0	9.3	6.9	5.0	3.0	7.3
Source 1: Turkish State Meteorological Service
Source 2: NOAA NCEI(humidity, sun 1991-2020), Meteomanz (snowy days 2013–2024)

== Sports ==
The Runfire Cappadocia Ultramarathon, a multiday track running ultramarathon of desert concept, has been held every July since 2012. Over six days, the race takes in a circuit of 244 km (152 mi), passing through several areas of Cappadocia including Lake Tuz.

== Notable residents ==
- Piri Mehmed Pasha Ottoman Grand Vizier 1518–1523

== Sources ==
- Beihammer, Alexander Daniel (2017). Byzantium and the Emergence of Muslim Turkish Anatolia, ca. 1040-1130. Routledge. ISBN 978-1-138-22959-4.
- Stierlin, Henry. 1998. Turkey: From the Selçuks to the Ottomans. New York: Taschen, 240.
- Yavuz, Aysil Tükel. 1997. The Concepts that Shape Anatolian Seljuq Caravanserais. In Muqarnas XIV: An Annual on the Visual Culture of the Islamic World. Gülru Necipoglu (ed). Leiden: E.J. Brill, 80–95 (download)
- Turkish Ministry of Culture and Tourism. "General information on Aksaray, Turkey" (in Turkish). Archived from the original on 2012-02-11.
- Aksaray e-Ansiklopedi. "Encyclopedia about Aksaray Castle" (in Turkish).
- Vryonis, Speros (1971). The Decline of Medieval Hellenism in Asia Minor and the Process of Islamization from the Eleventh through the Fifteenth Century. University of California Press. ISBN 0-520-01597-5.
