= Aksaray Museum =

Museum in Aksaray District, Turkey

- Aksaray Müzesi
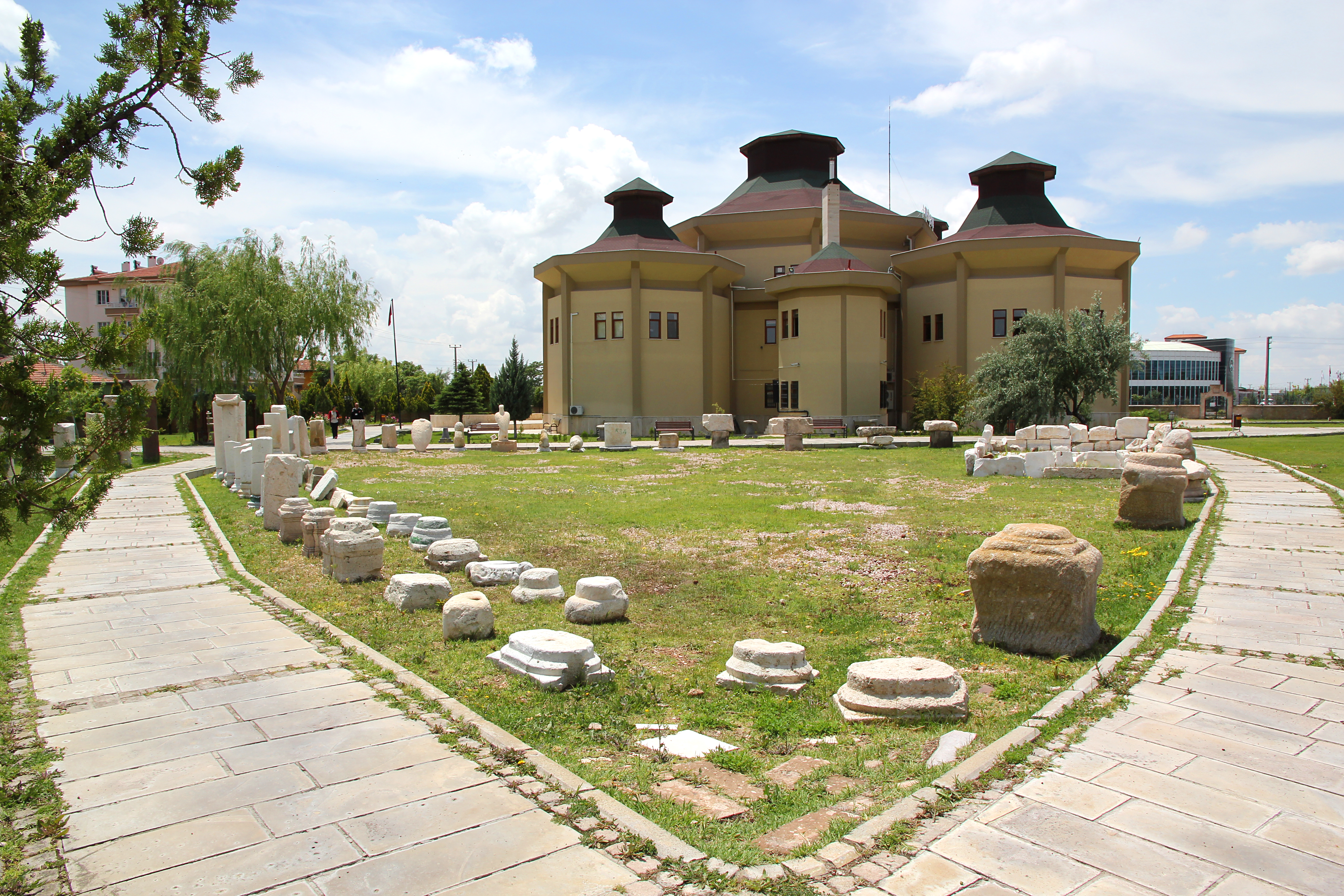
- Museum building

- Aksaray Museum
- Established: 2014; 12 years ago
- Coordinates: 38°21′40″N 33°59′37″E
- Type: Archaeology
- Owner: Ministry of Culture

Aksaray Museum is a museum in Aksaray, Turkey.

The museum is on the state highway D.750 connecting Aksaray to South Turkey at 38°21′40″N 33°59′37″E. The first museum collection was established in Zinciriye Medrese in 1969. In 2014 the new museum was opened in its new building. The museum has 10,200 square metres (110,000 sq ft) open and 2,400 square metres (26,000 sq ft) closed area. The general appearance of the 3 storey building resembles that of Seljukid cupolas in the city and the fairy chimneys lying to the east of Aksaray.

There are 15639 items in the museum.

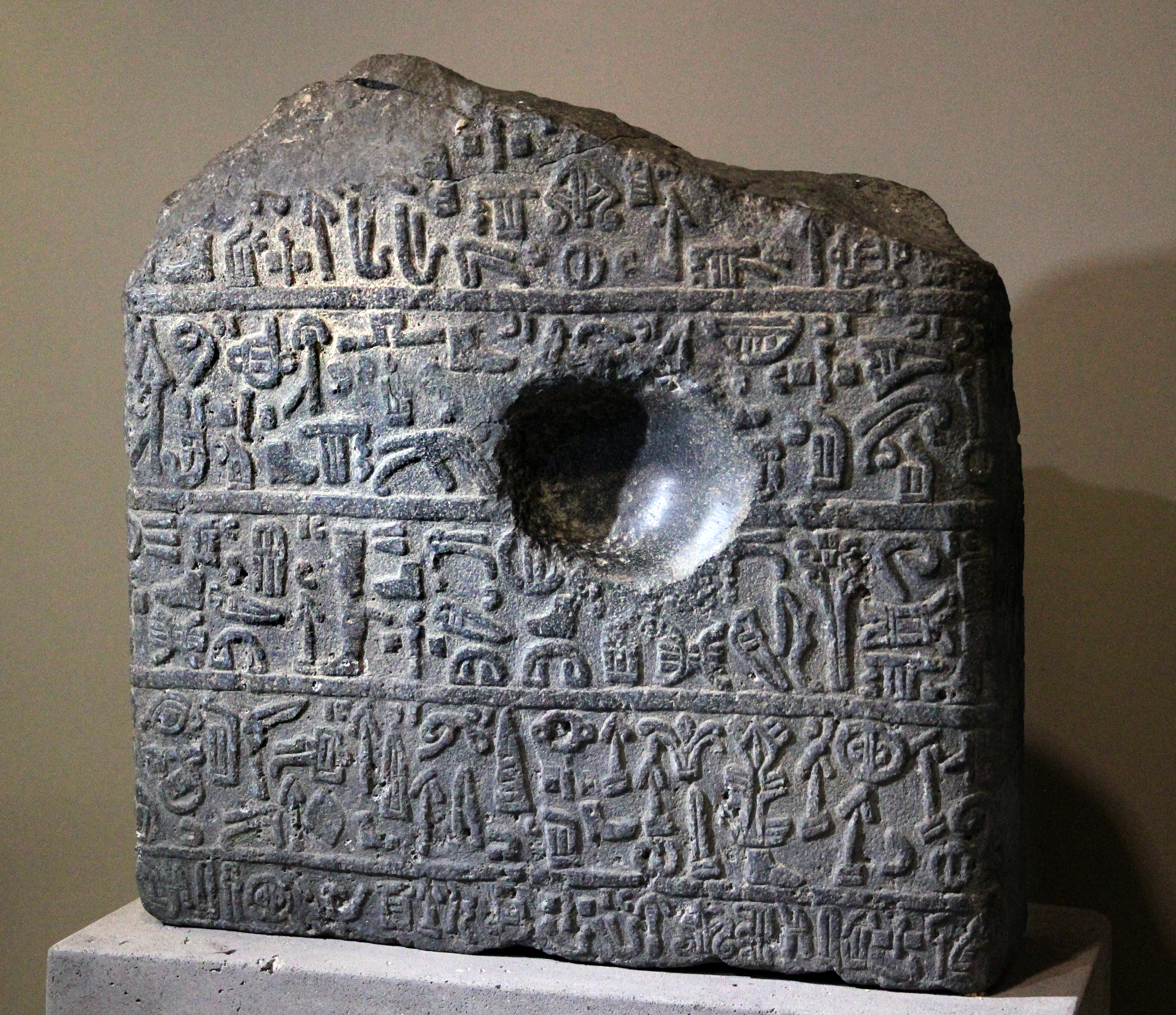
Aksaray stele

One of the most important items exhibited in the open area of the museum is the Aksaray stele. It is the lower half of an inscription with a relief of Hittite Storm God. Its dimensions are 88x99x39 cm^{3}. The inscription is in Luwian language. Another group of interesting items is the group of 12 mummies from the Byzantine era. Two of these mummies are cat mummies.

== Gallery ==
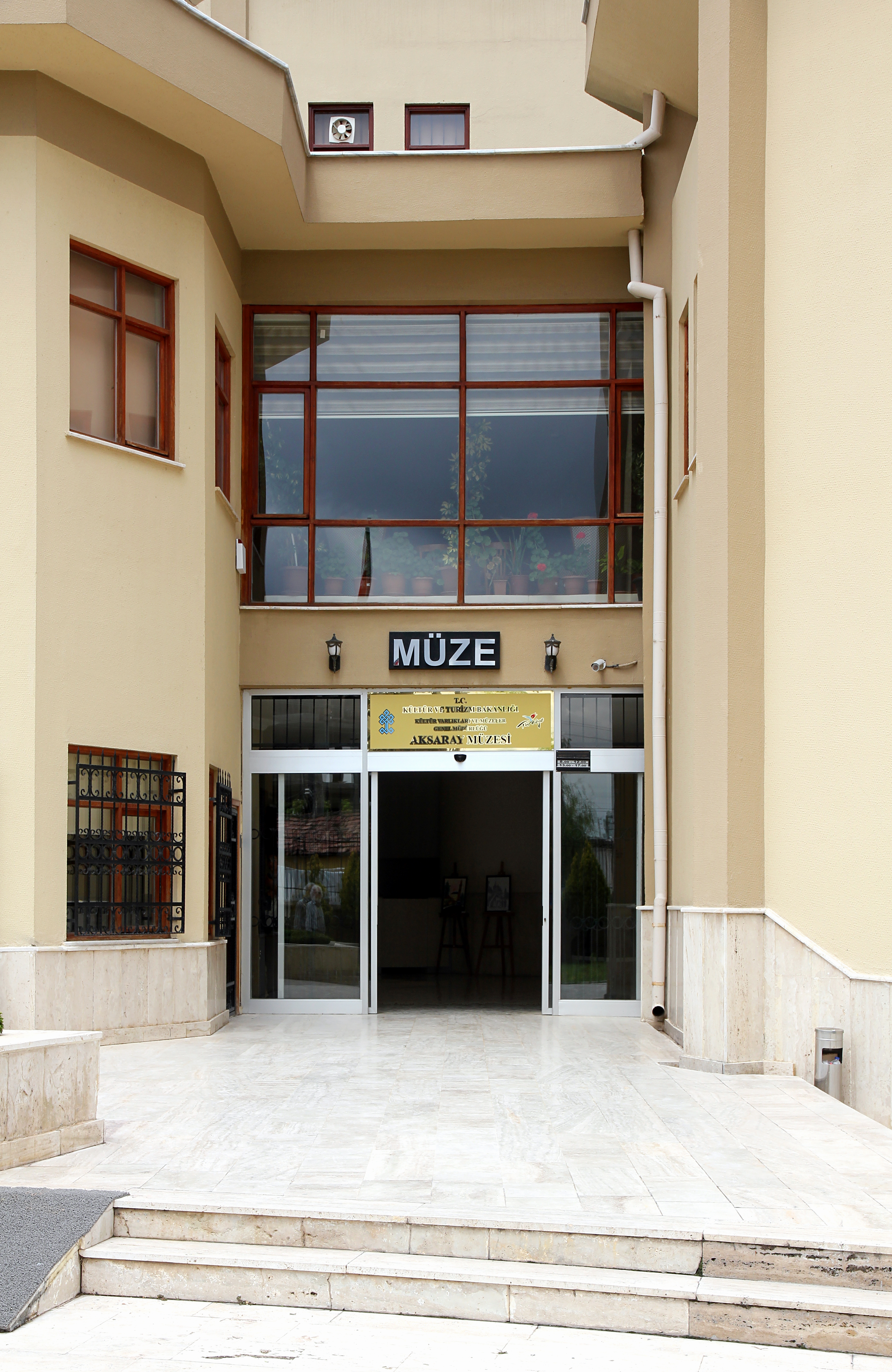

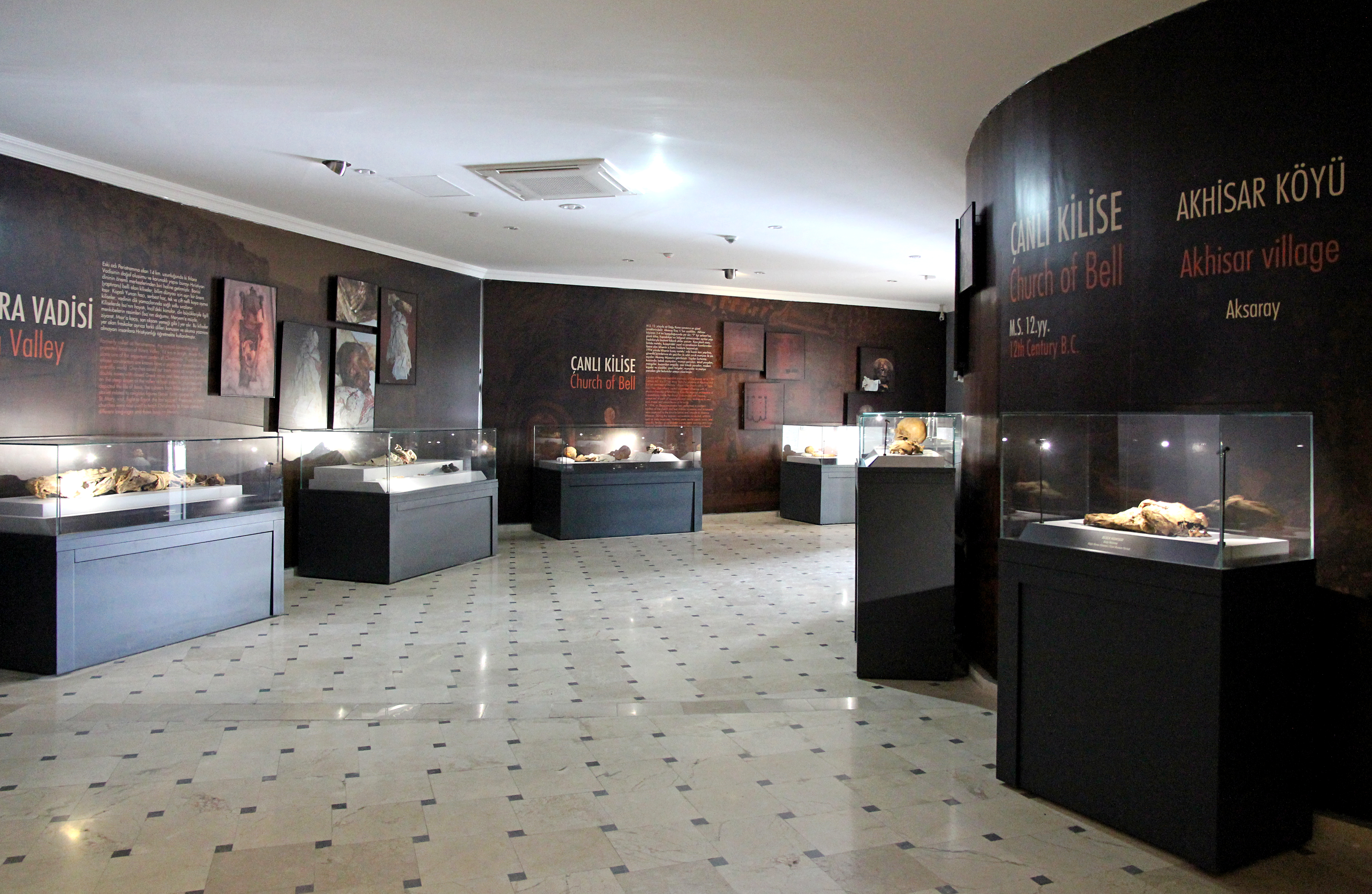

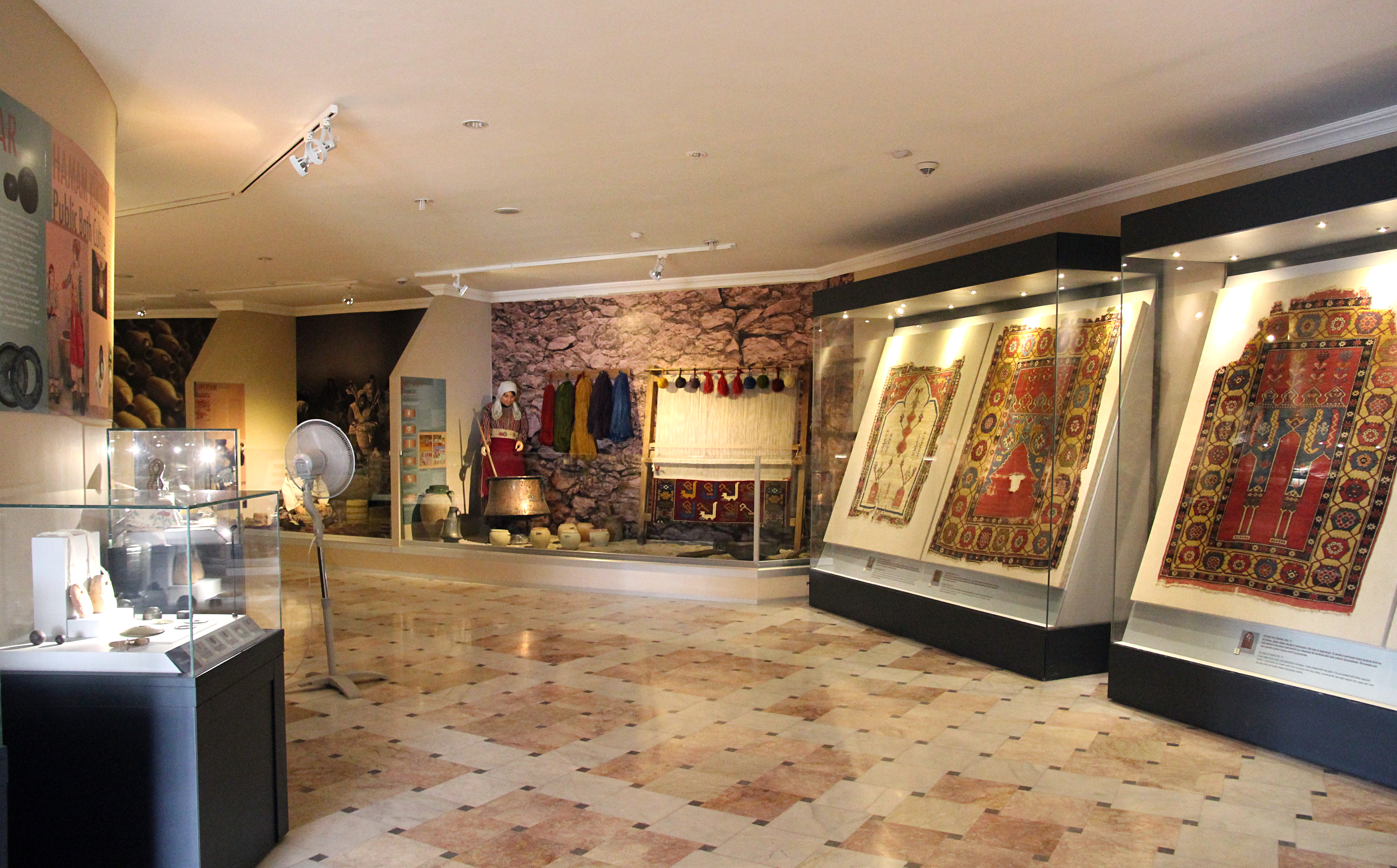

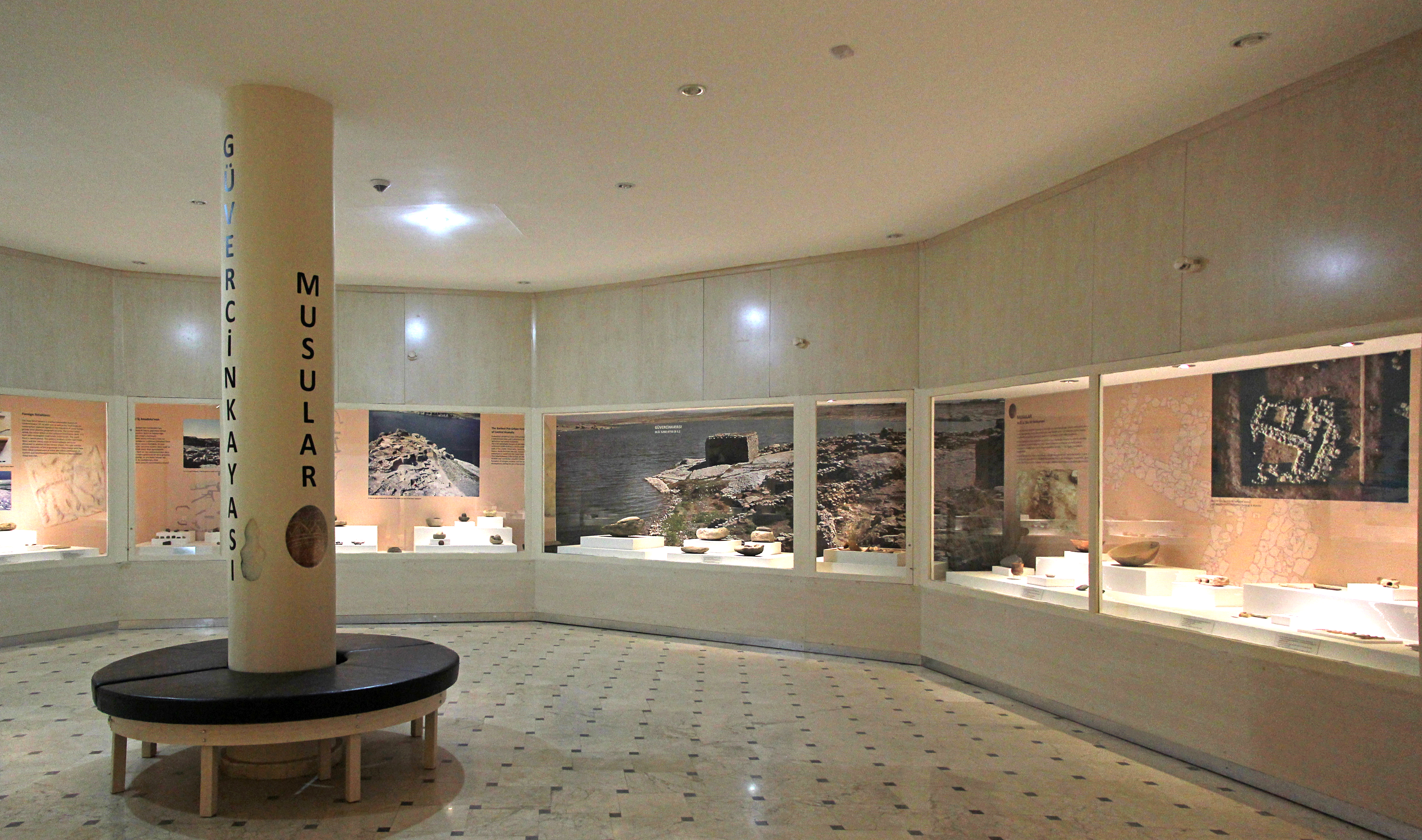
