= Aksaray Stele =

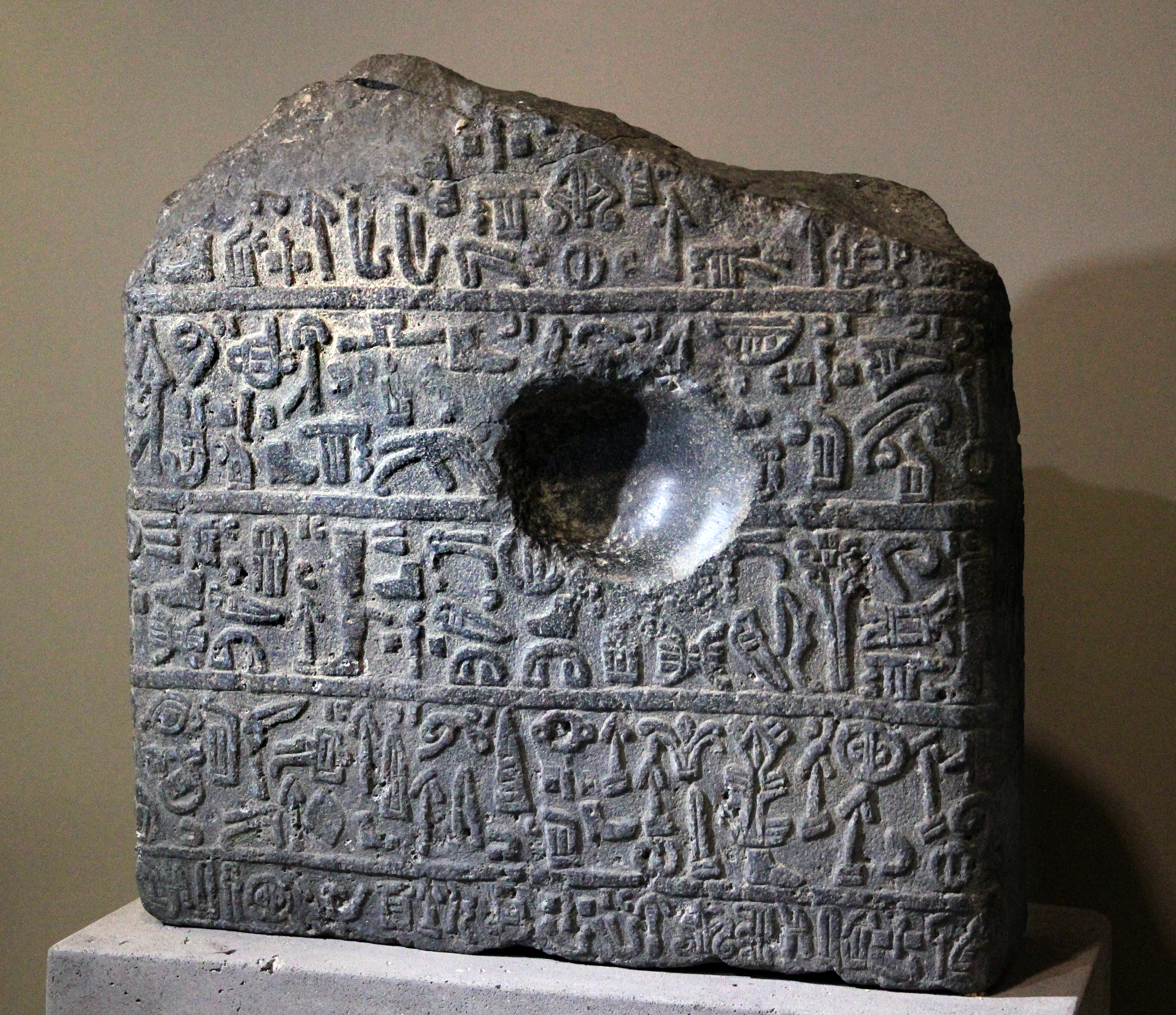
Aksaray stele

The Aksaray Stele is a Syro-Hittite monument that was found in the city of Aksaray in western Cappadocia in central Turkey. It is exhibited in Aksaray Museum (inventory number 1-1-77).

According to the British hithitologist John David Hawkins, the site of the find had been the construction site for the Mehmet Şişman İşhane in Hükümet Caddesi. It was published in 1982 by Massimo Poetto.

Hawkins published the stele in his Corpus of Hieroglyphic Luwian Inscriptions in 2000.

== Description ==
The stone block is 88 centimeters (35 in) high, 90 centimeters (35 in) wide and 39 centimeters (15 in) thick. The top half is missing. The obverse shows the lower part of a figure to about the waist, probably a weather god.

The content of the inscription is a dedication by King Kiyakiyas. He describes the prosperity in his reign and the benevolence of the weather god Tarhunzas.

Kiyakiyas is believed to be identical with King Kiyakki of Šinuḫtu, who ruled prior to 718 BC. At that time, he was seized and deported by the Neo-Assyrian king Sargon II. Thus the inscription indicates that the ancient kingdom of Sinuhtu was located at Aksaray.

Kiyakiyas is also mentioned in the Topada rock inscription (de:Felsinschrift von Topada) as one of the kings who were friendly with Wasusarma of Tabal. Thus the inscription can be dated to the late 8th century BC.

== See also ==
- Tunna
- List of Neo-Hittite kings

== Literature ==
- Mustafa Kalaç: Ein Steinbruchstück mit luwischen Hieroglyphen in Aksaray bei Niğde In: Zeitschrift für vergleichende Sprachforschung Bd. 92, 1978 S. 117–125.
- John David Hawkins: Corpus of Hieroglyphic Luwian Inscriptions. Vol. I: Inscriptions of the Iron Age. Part 2: Text. Amuq, Aleppo, Hama, Tabal, Assur Letters, Miscellaneous, Seals, Indices. (= Studies in Indo-European Language and Culture 8). de Gruyter, Berlin, 2000, ISBN 3-11-010864-X, S. 475–478.
