= Sultanhanı =

- Municipality
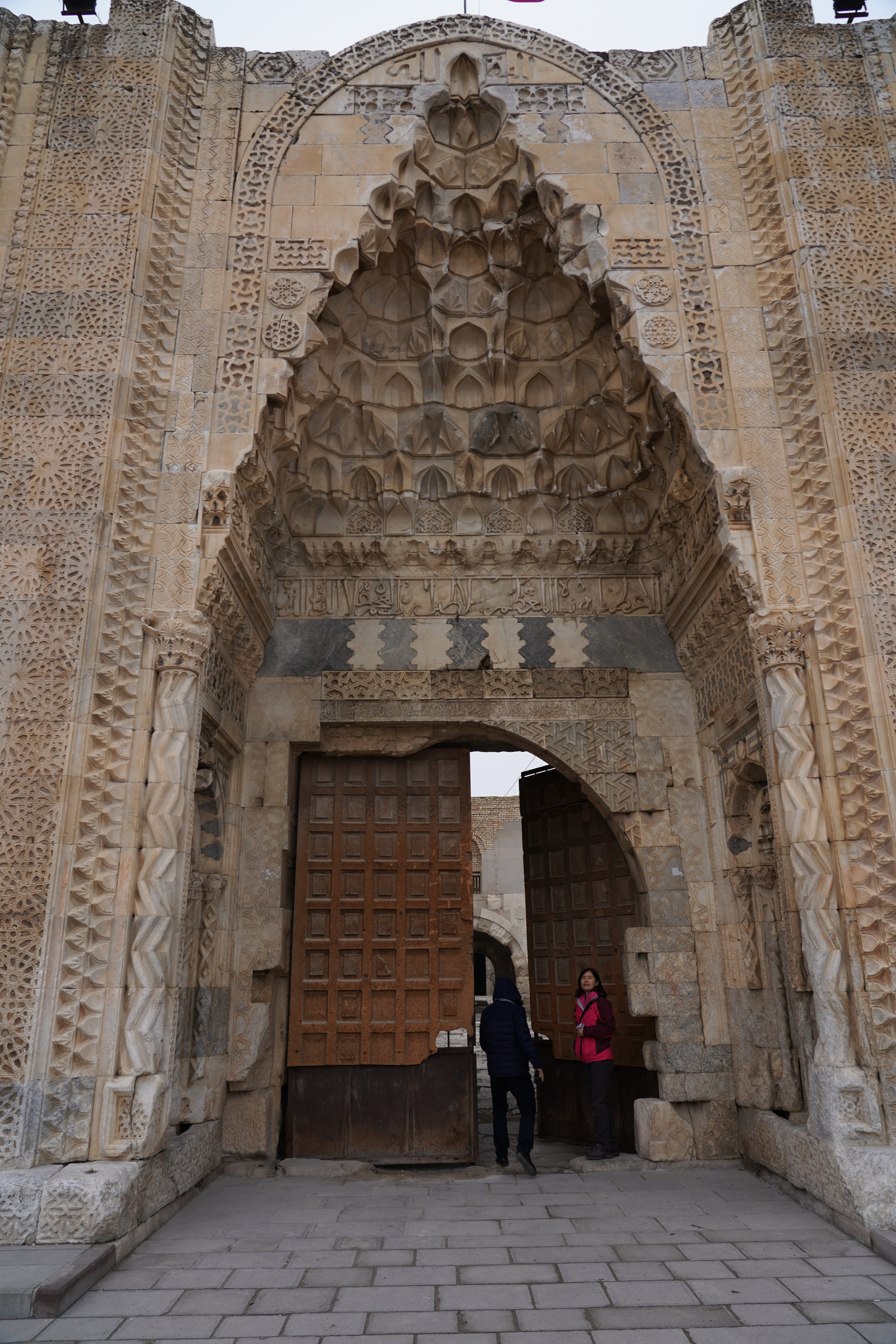
- Monumental gateway of the Sultan Han

- Location within Turkey Location within Turkey Central Anatolia
- Coordinates: 38°15′N 33°33′E
- Country: Turkey
- Province: Aksaray
- District: Sultanhanı

Government
  - Mayor: Fahri Solak (AKP)
- Elevation: 945 m (3,100 ft)
- Population (2021): 10,958
- Time zone: UTC+3 (TRT)
- Area code: 0382
- Website: www.sultanhani.bel.tr

Sultanhanı is a town in Aksaray Province, Turkey. It is named after the famous han (caravanserai) within the town. It is the seat of Sultanhanı District, created in 2017. Its population is 10,958 (2021).

== Geography ==
The distance to Aksaray is about 40 kilometres (25 mi) and to the south coast of Lake Tuz is 20 kilometres (12 mi).

== History ==
Presently, Sultanhanı is not on one of the main highways of Turkey. But it was one of the most important stops in caravan routes during the Middle Ages. The 4,866 square metres (52,380 sq ft) Seljuk han, which was commissioned by Alaattin Keykubat ('Alā' ad-Dīn Kay Qubād) is considered one of the best preserved hans of the Seljuk period. After the Age of Discovery, like other caravan routes the Sultanhanı han became neglected.

Another milestone in local history was the Battle of Sultanhanı (also called the Battle of Aksaray) in 1256, where a Mongol army under the command of Baiju defeated the Seljuks.

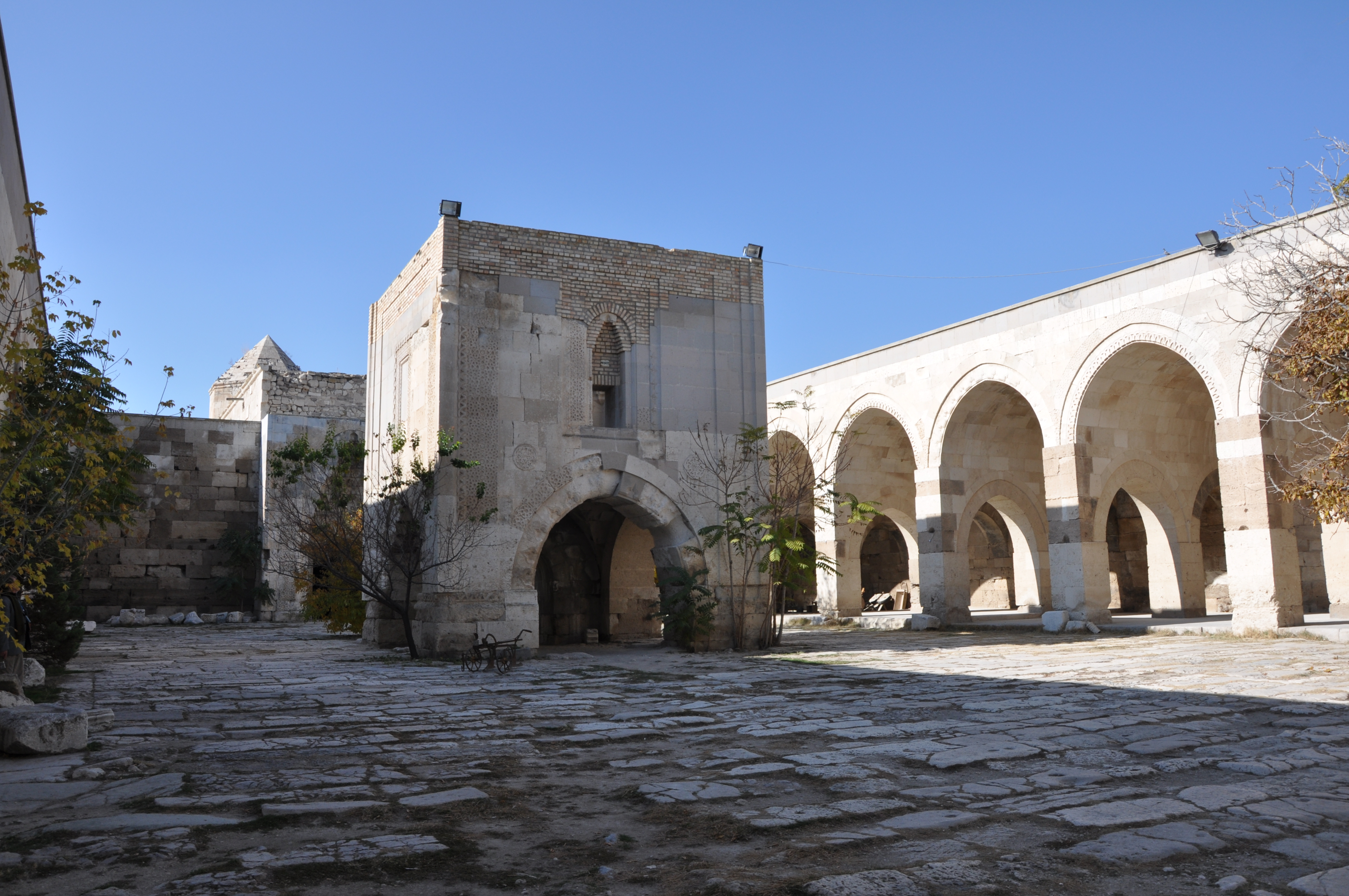
Sultanhani Caravanserai

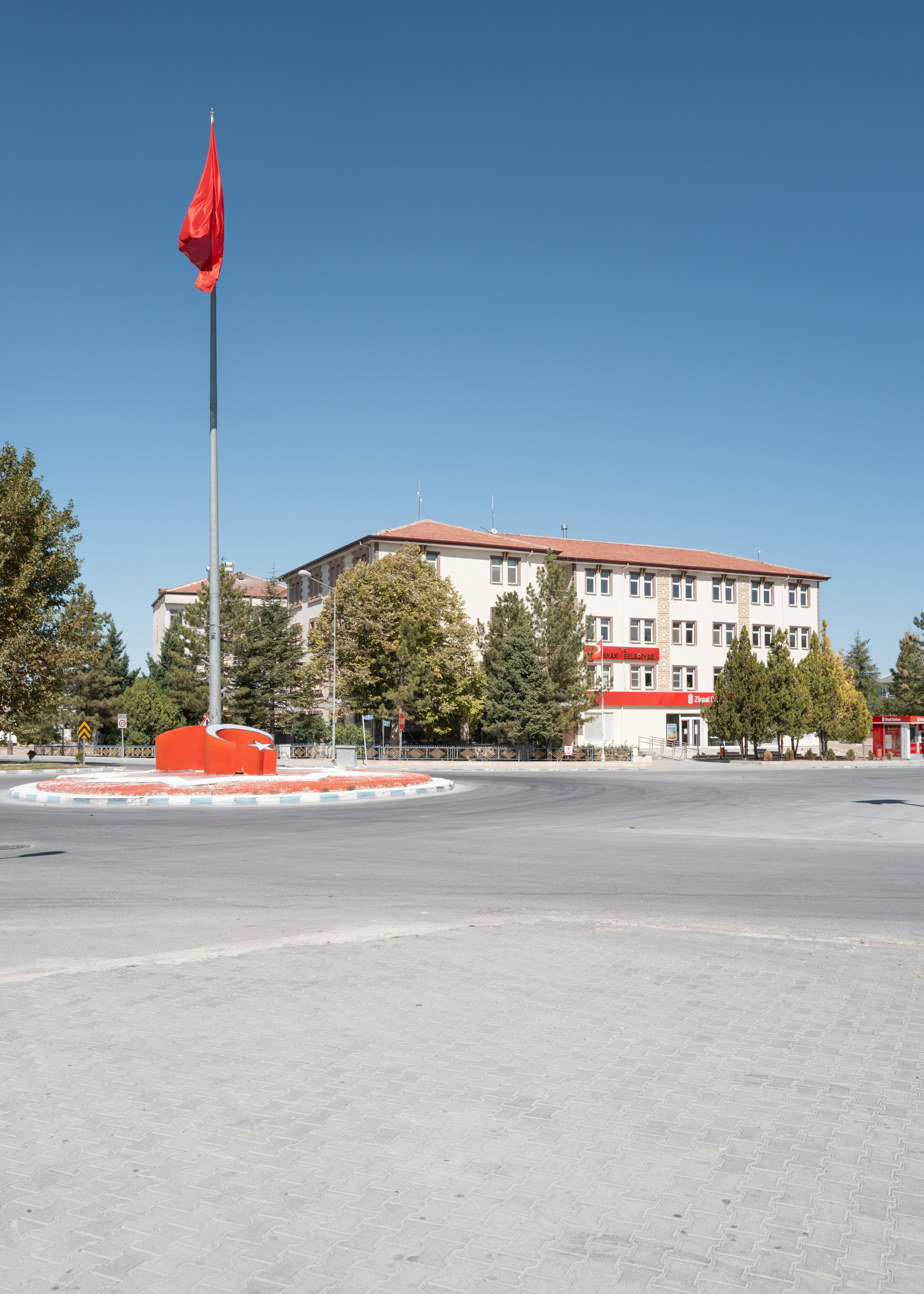
Municipality building of Sultanhanı, Roundabout on Atatürk Street.

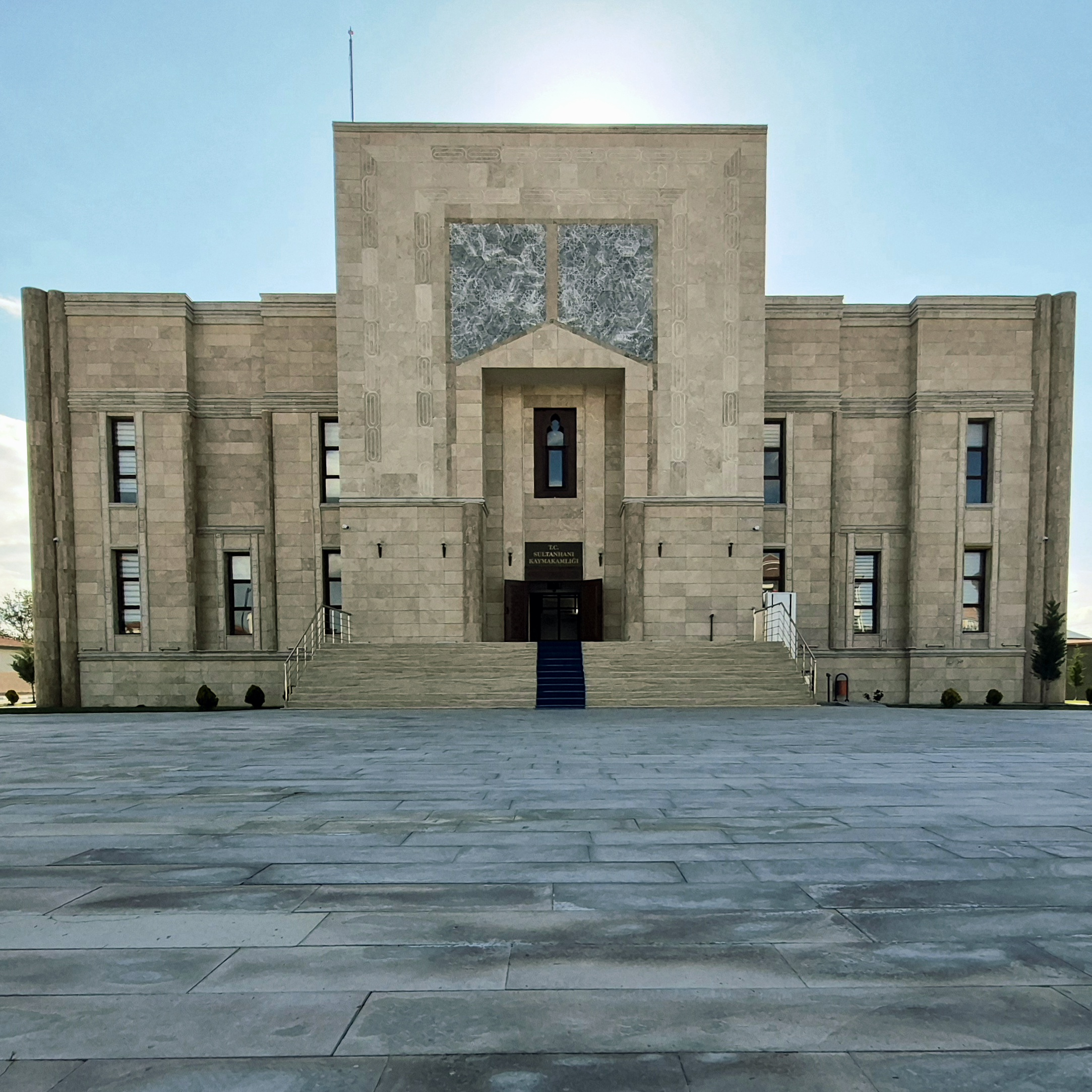
Sultanhani Kaymakamlığı (district office)

== Economy ==
Although the land around Sultanhanı is quite salty, the town economy is flourishing. Main agricultural products are cereal and sugar cane, produced by mechanized agriculture. There is a sugar mill in the town. Another profitable business is ancient rug and carpet restoration. Some people are employed in stock breeding.

== See also ==
- Lake Tuz Natural Gas Storage
