= List of Seljuk caravanserais in Turkey =

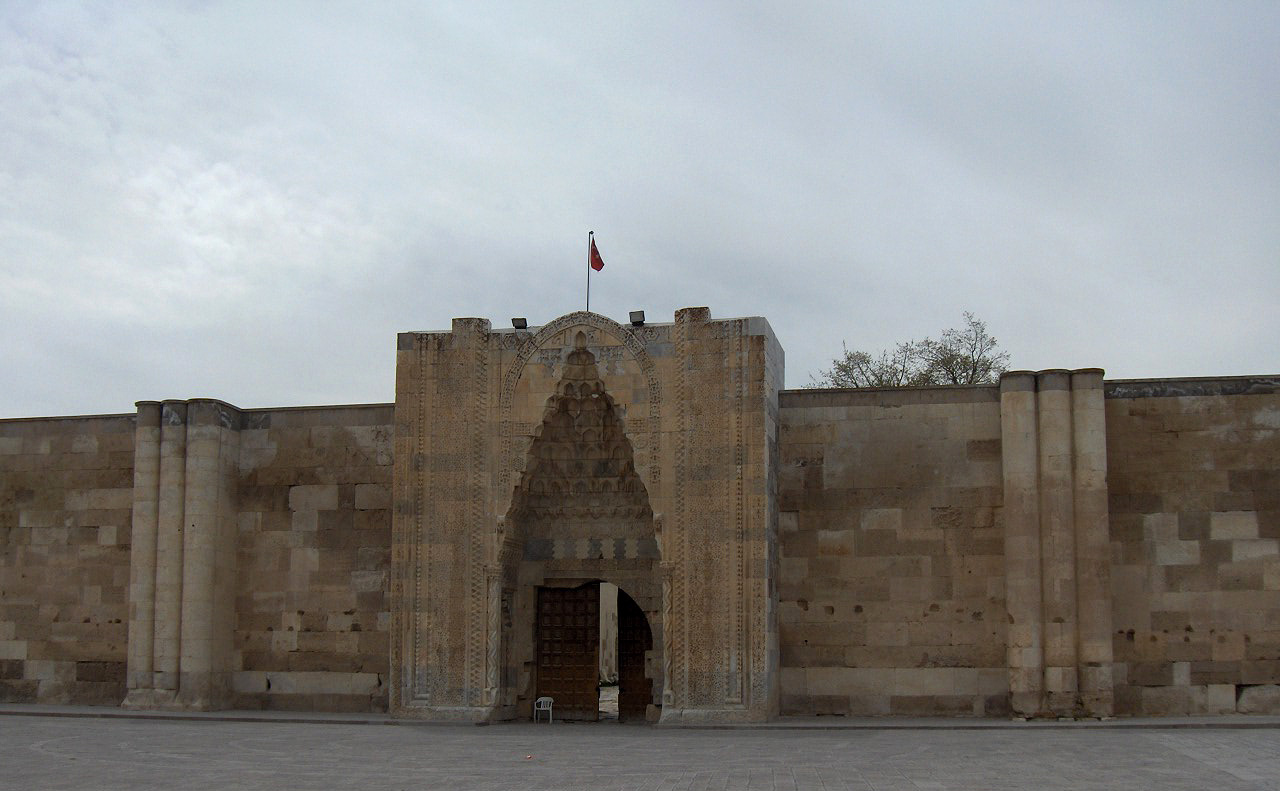
Portal of Sultanhan, located on the road between Aksaray and Konya

Below a list of historic caravanserais (roadside inns) located in Turkey and built during the Seljuk period. The list is in chronological order. In Turkish, the words han and kervansaray can both refer. No strict distinction between them is clear, but usually hans were in cities while kervansarays were in the rural areas. Being far from the cities, caravanserais offered accommodation and other amenities to caravans.

The name of the caravanserai is shown in the first column. In everyday speech, the name is sometimes merged with the suffix han (e.g. Boz → Bozhan). The people who commissioned the construction are shown in the second column. They were generally sultans (like Alaeddin Keykubad I), mothers of sultans (like Melike Mahperi), atabegs (like Ertokuş), governors (like Karasungur), or occasionally persons with no official status. The approximate date of construction is shown in the third column and the location of the caravanserai is shown in the last column with reference to the end points of the road. Where applicable, the name of the location is also given.

== The list ==
Name	Commissioned by	App. construction date	Location (between)
Okla	Kılıç Arslan II	1156-1192	Aksaray-Konya
Altun Apa	Altın Apa	1201	Beyşehir-Konya
Argıt	Altın Apa	1201	Akşehir- Konya
Kızılören	Emir Kutlu	1206	Beyşehir Konya
Kuru Çeşme	Gıyasettin Keyhüsrev I (?)	1207	Beyşehir-Konya
Dokuzun Derbent	Ebi Bekr	1210	Konya-Akşehir
Edvir (Evdir)	Izzeddin Keykavus I	1210-1219	Antalya-Isparta 36.9883°N 30.58°E
Alay	Alaeddin Keykubad I	1219-1236	Aksaray-Kayseri
Eshabikeyf	Nuşrateddin Hasan	1215-1234	Besni-Kayseri
Seyfettin Ferruh	Seyfettin Ferruh	1215	Konya-Seydişehir
Taşhan	Kaykaus I	1218	Hekimhan-Malatya
Hekim	El Hekim El Malati	1219-1236	Malatya-Sivas
Pınarbaşı	Atabey Ertokuş	1220	Denizli-Eğirdir
Ertokuş	Atabey Ertokuş	1223	Eğirdir-Konya (Gelendost)
Kadın	Raziye	1223	Konya-Akşehir (Kadınhanı)
Ebul Kasım Ahmet	Ebül Kasım	1224	Niksar
Muhliseddin	Musliseddin	1228	Zile
Sultan	Alaeddin Keykubad I	1229	Aksaray-Konya
Çardak	Esedüddün Ayas	1230	Denizli-Eğridir (Çardak)
Alara	Alaeddin Keykubad I	1231-1232	Alanya-Antalya 36.6923°N 31.7238°E
Sultan	Alaeddin Keykubad I	1232-1236	Kayseri-Sivas
Karasungur	Karasungur	1235-1236	Denizli
Sadettin (Zazadin)	Sadettin Köpek	1235-1236	Aksaray-Konya
Kırkgöz	Gıyasettin Keyhüsrev II	1236-1246	Antalya-Isparta
Şarapsa	Gıyasettin Keyhüsrev II (?)	1235-1245	Konaklı 36.5883°N 31.8706°E
Eğridir	Gıyasettin Keyhüsrev	1237-1238	Eğridir
Ezine Pazar	Malike Mahperi	1238-1246	Amasya-Tokat
İncir	Gıyasettin Keyhüsrev II	1238-1239	Antalya-Isparta
Pazar	Melike MahPeri	1238-1239	Amasya-Tokat
Çınçınlı Sultan	Melike Mahperi	1239-1240	Kırşehir-Zile
Ağzıkara	Hace Mesut	1231-1240	Aksaray-Kayseri
Karatay	Celalettin Karatay	1240-1241	Kayseri-Malatya
Susuz	Sadık Ağa	1244-1246	Antalya-Isparta
Ruz Apa	Camedar Ruzapa	1246-1249	Akşehir-Konya
Yeni (Akhan)	Karasungur	1249-1250	Denizli
İshaklı	Sahip Ata	1249	Afyon-Akşehir (Sultandağ)
Karatay	Celalettin Karatay (?)	1253	Konya
Boz	Karasungur	1253-1254	Denizli-Eğridir
Durağan	Pervane Süleyman	1266	Boyabat-Vezirköprü
Ilgın	Sahip Ata	1267-1268	Akşehir-Konya (Ilgın)
Kesikköprü	Cacabey	1268	Aksaray-Kırşehir
Çayhan	Ebül Mücahit Yusuf	1278-1279	Afyon-Akşehir (Çay)
Dibli		1292	Divriği-Harput

== See also ==
- Anatolian Seljuk architecture
