= Yeşiltömek =

- Village
- Location in Turkey Yeşiltömek (Turkey Central Anatolia)
- Coordinates: 38°17′N 33°31′E
- Country: Turkey
- Province: Aksaray
- District: Sultanhanı
- Population (2021): 672
- Time zone: UTC+3 (TRT)

Yeşiltömek is a village in the Sultanhanı District, Aksaray Province, Turkey. Its population is 672 (2021).
