= Sultanhanı District =

- District
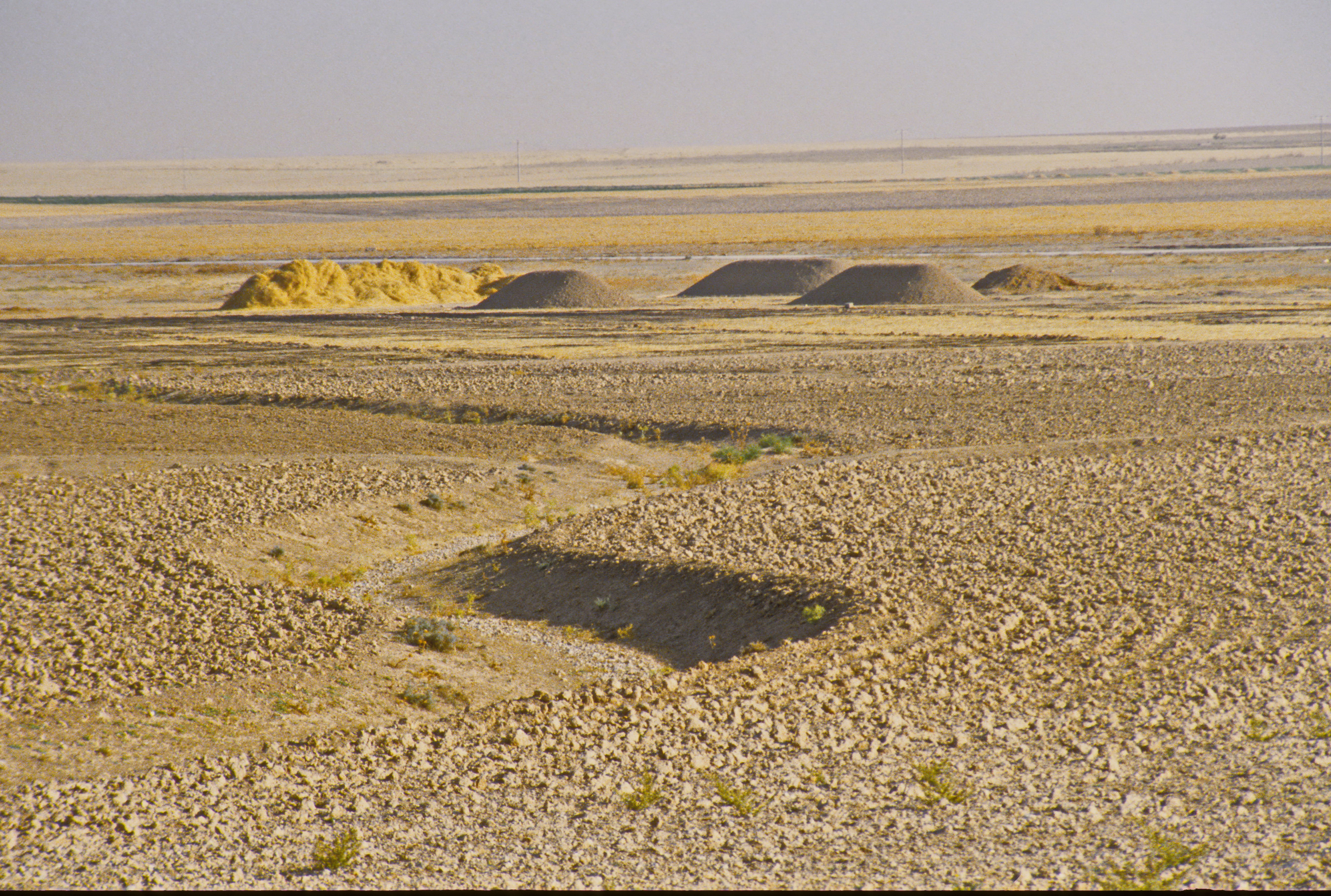
- Lake Tuz near Sultanhanı

- Location within Turkey Location within Turkey Central Anatolia
- Coordinates: 38°15′N 33°33′E
- Country: Turkey
- Province: Aksaray
- Seat: Sultanhanı
- Area: 463 km^{2} (179 sq mi)
- Population (2025): 12,811
  - Density: 27.7/km^{2} (71.7/sq mi)
- Time zone: UTC+3 (TRT)
- Website: www.sultanhani.gov.tr

Sultanhanı District is a district of Aksaray Province of Turkey. Spread over an area of 463 km^{2} (179 sq mi), it had a population of 12,811 in 2025. The district consists of the municipality of Sultanhanı and the village of Yeşiltömek.

== History ==
The settlement developed along the ancient Silk Road, around a caravanserai constructed in 1229 during the reign of Sultan Kayqubad I of the Seljuq Empire. The building was designed by the Syrian architect Abdurrahman bin Haflan and was underwent further restoration in 1278 during the reign of Kaykhusraw III. The caravanserai consists of an open courtyard, hall, a mosque and several inscriptions.

Sultanhanı was a town in the Aksaray District until 2017, when it was carved out as a separate district on 25 August 2017 under Law No. 694.

== Geography ==
Sultanhanı District is a district of Aksaray Province, located in the Central Anatolia region of Turkey. Spread over an area of 463 km^{2} (179 sq mi), it is located along the highway connecting Aksaray and Konya. It has an average altitude of 945 m (3,100 ft), and experiences a continental climate.

The district consists of the municipality of Sultanhanı and the village of Yeşiltömek.

== Demographics ==
According to 2025 population statistics published by the Turkish Statistical Institute, Sultanhanı District had a population of 12,811 inhabitants. It was the fifth most populous district in Aksaray Province, accounting for approximately 2.9% of the provincial population. Its population increased by approximately 12.6% between 2020 and 2025.

Agriculture, animal husbandry, tourism, and handicraft are among the district's economic activities. The district had approximately 26,560.4 hectares (65,632 acres) of agricultural land in 2025. Cereal grains and fodder crops are the major agricultural produce. Carpet weaving and restoration is an important industry in the district. The carpet industry started in the 1970s through the production of hand-knotted carpets, and expanded in the 1990s. Several artisans and workshops engage in carpet weaving and historical carpets from several countries are brought to Sultanhanı for restoration.
