= Sultan Han (Kayseri) =

Caravanseri in Turkey

Coordinates: 38°58′22.5″N 35°53′43″E

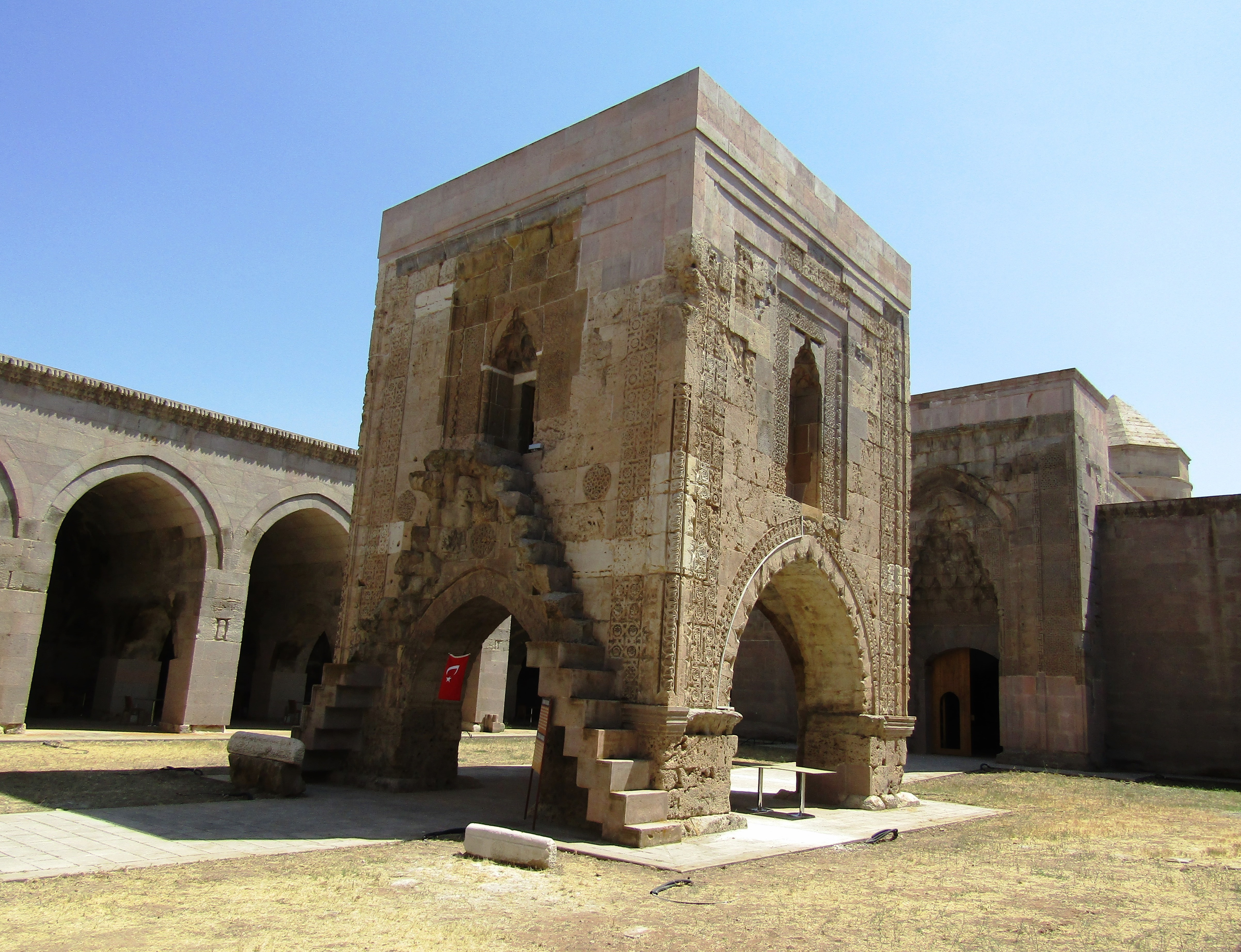
Courtyard of the caravanserai, with the elevated prayer room in the center

Sultan Han is a historic Seljuk-era caravanserai in Turkey, located 47 km northeast of Kayseri on the road to Sivas, in an area also known as Tuzhisar. It was built between 1232 and 1237 CE by Sultan Ala ad-Din Kayqubad I.

== Description ==
The caravanserai covers an area of 3,900 square meters, making it the second-largest medieval caravanserai in Turkey after the other Sultan Han near Aksaray. Like other Seljuk caravanserais, it served as a stop for travelers and merchants along the major trade routes of the region, providing lodging and other basic services.

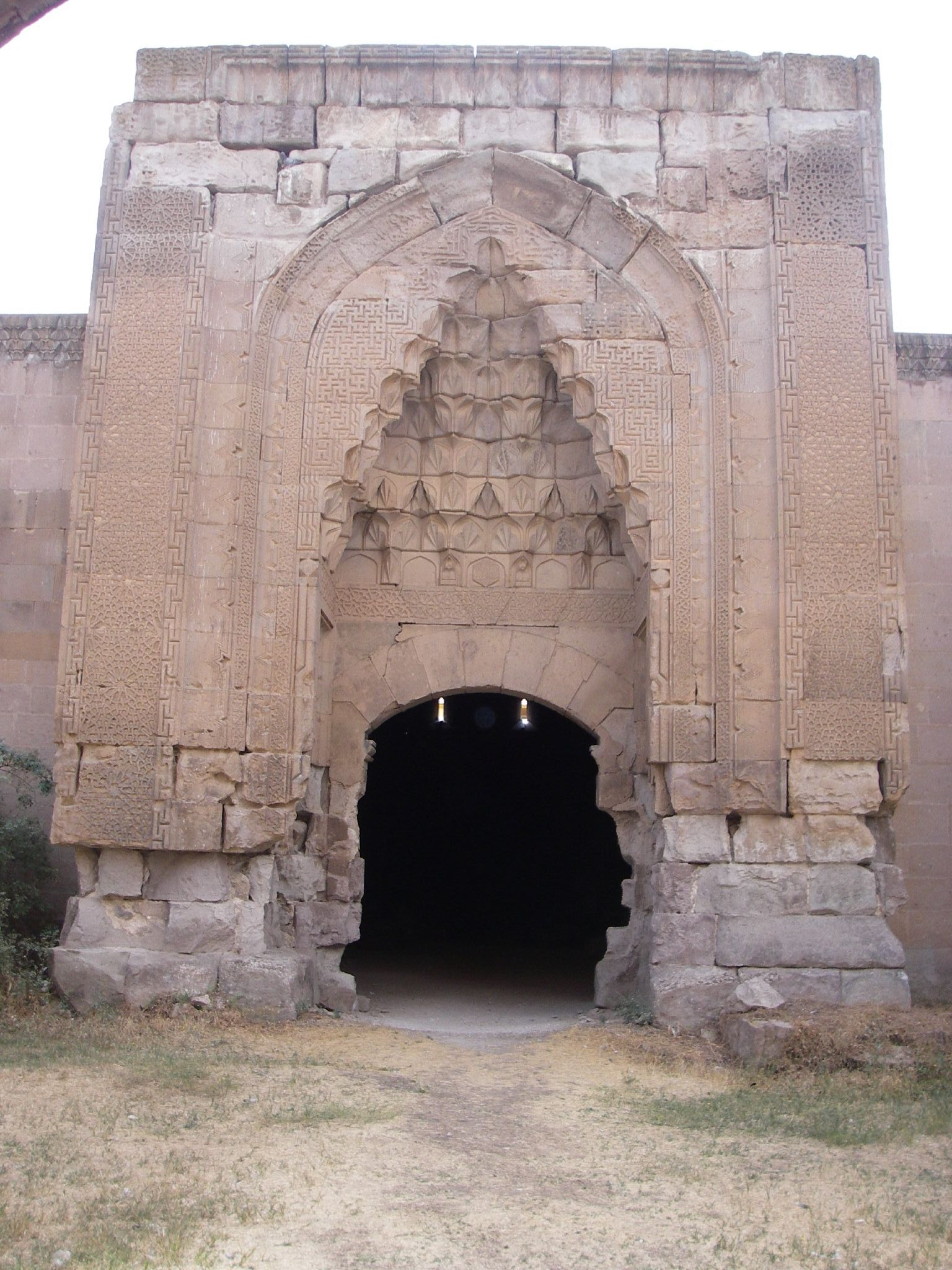
Entrance portal of the winter hall

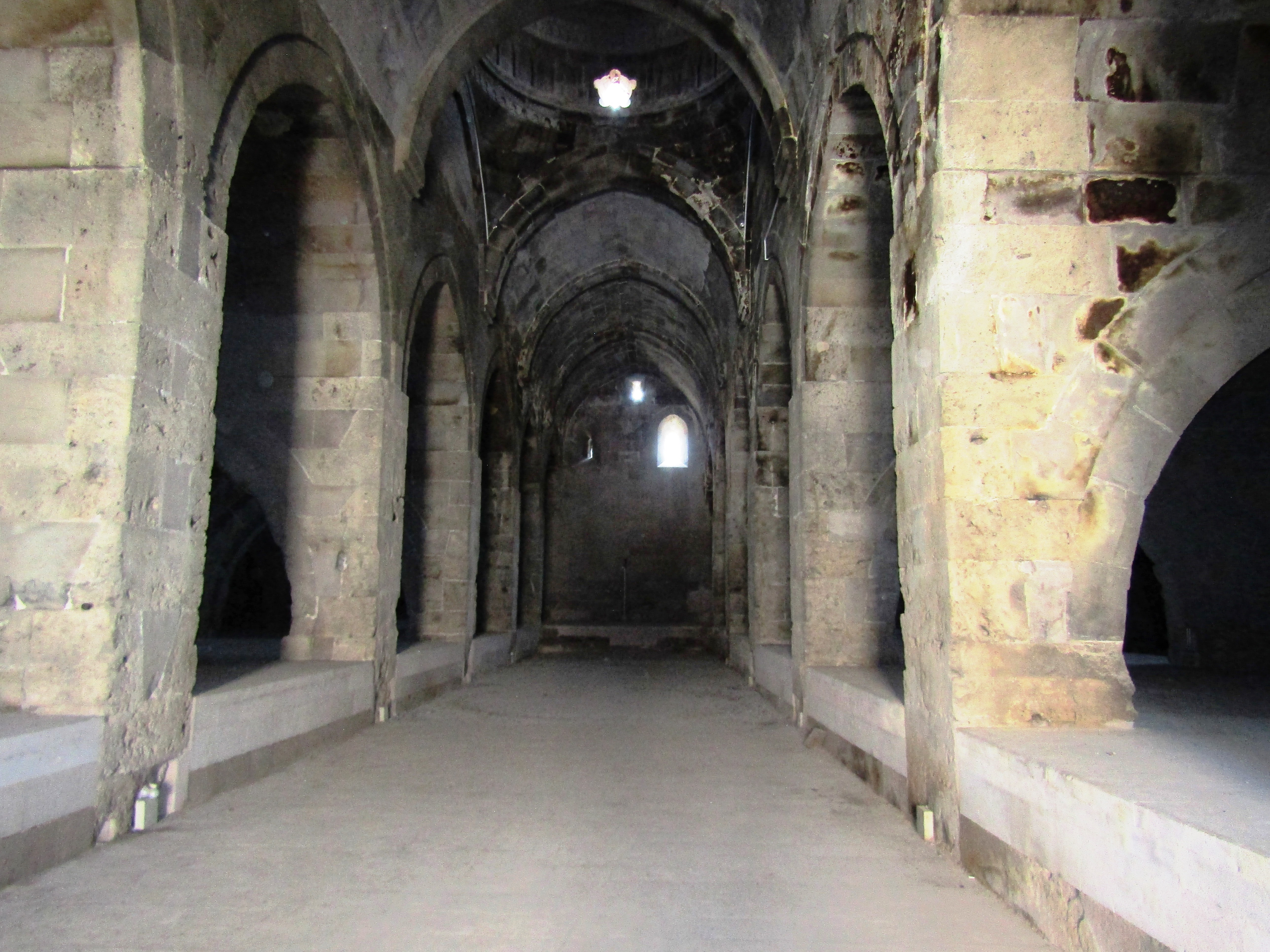
Interior of the winter hall

It shares a similar layout to the other Sultan Han. Its exterior has a fortified appearance and the entrance is marked by a monumental portal with rich stone-carved decoration including a vaulted canopy of muqarnas. This entrance leads to a large interior courtyard surrounded by arcades, at the middle of which is a small square stone chamber elevated on four pillars, which served as a small mosque. Opposite the entrance, at the other end of the courtyard, is another portal which leads to the "winter hall": a main vaulted nave with a central dome (marked by a conical roof on the outside), from which other vaulted chambers open on either side.

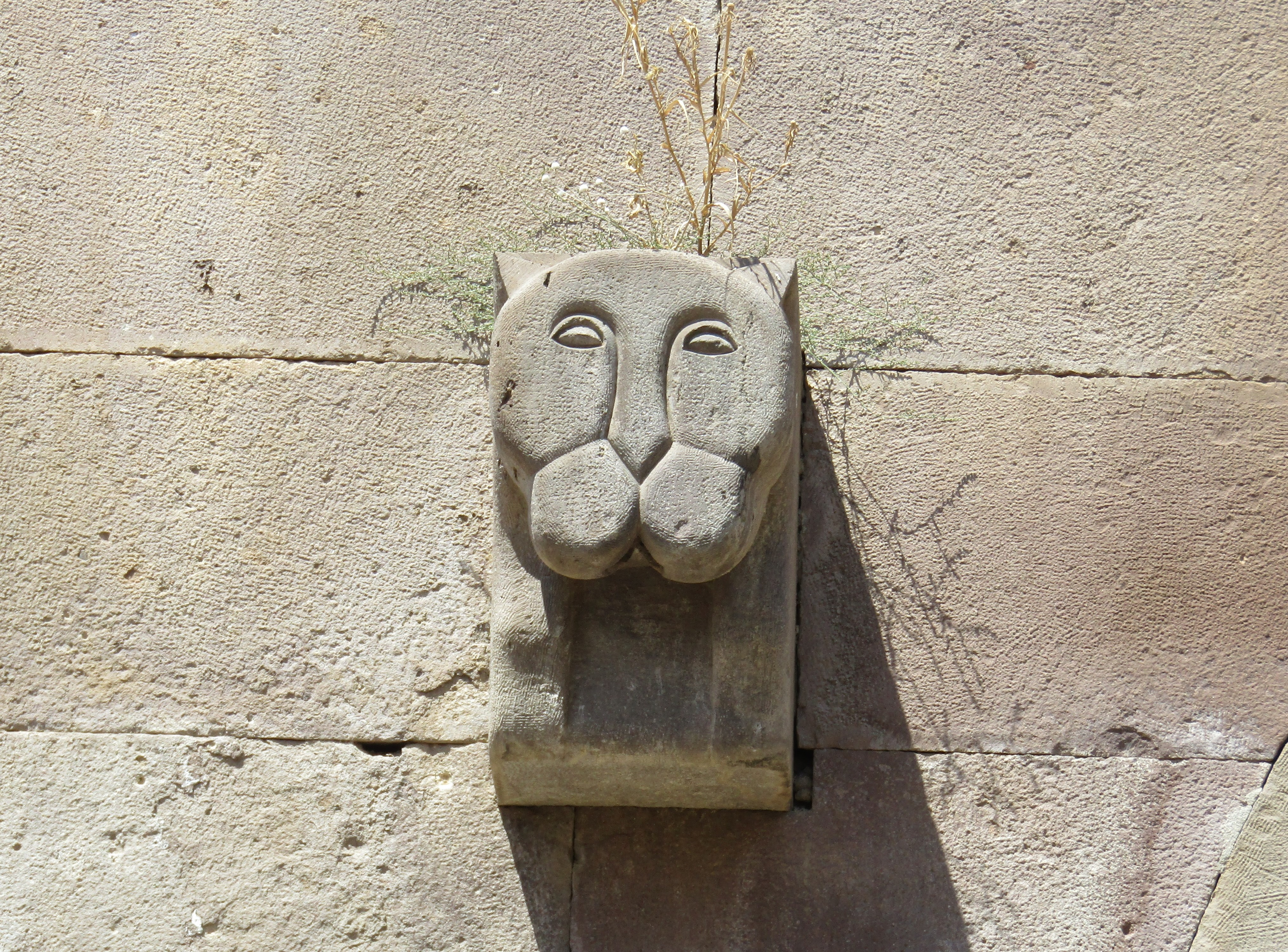
Downspout in the shape of a lion's head

The building also contains notable examples of Seljuk stone-carved animal motifs, including drain spouts resembling lion heads and serpentine dragon motifs along the lower arches of the elevated mosque in the courtyard.
