= Taşhan caravanserai =

Historical building in Hekimhan, Turkey

Taşhan caravanserai, also known as the Hekimhani or Hekim Han, is located in the town of Hekimhan, near Malatya in Turkey. The building was built in 1218 under Sultan İzzettin Keykavus I of the Sultanate of Rum. Its builder was a doctor (hekim), and it was built as a commercial enterprise.

== Architecture ==
The name of the architect of the caravanserai, Abu Salim ibn Abul Hasan, is recorded in a tri-lingual inscription. In the inscription, which is written in Armenian, Arabic, and Syriac, and dated 667 of the Armenian era, he is described as a Syrian and that the han was built as a commercial inn.

In the 17th century, a second part of the building with a large courtyard was added by Köprülü Mehmet Paşa, grand vizier of Ottoman Empire. The monument was restored several times during later centuries. It was used as a guesthouse which provided free food and accommodation to travelers for three days. This tradition lasted for centuries during the Seljuk and Ottoman Turkish periods.

The structure was heavily restored in 2007. Nowadays it is empty and waiting for visitors.

== See also ==
- List of Seljuk hans and kervansarays in Turkey
