= Sultan Han =

Caravanserai in Turkey

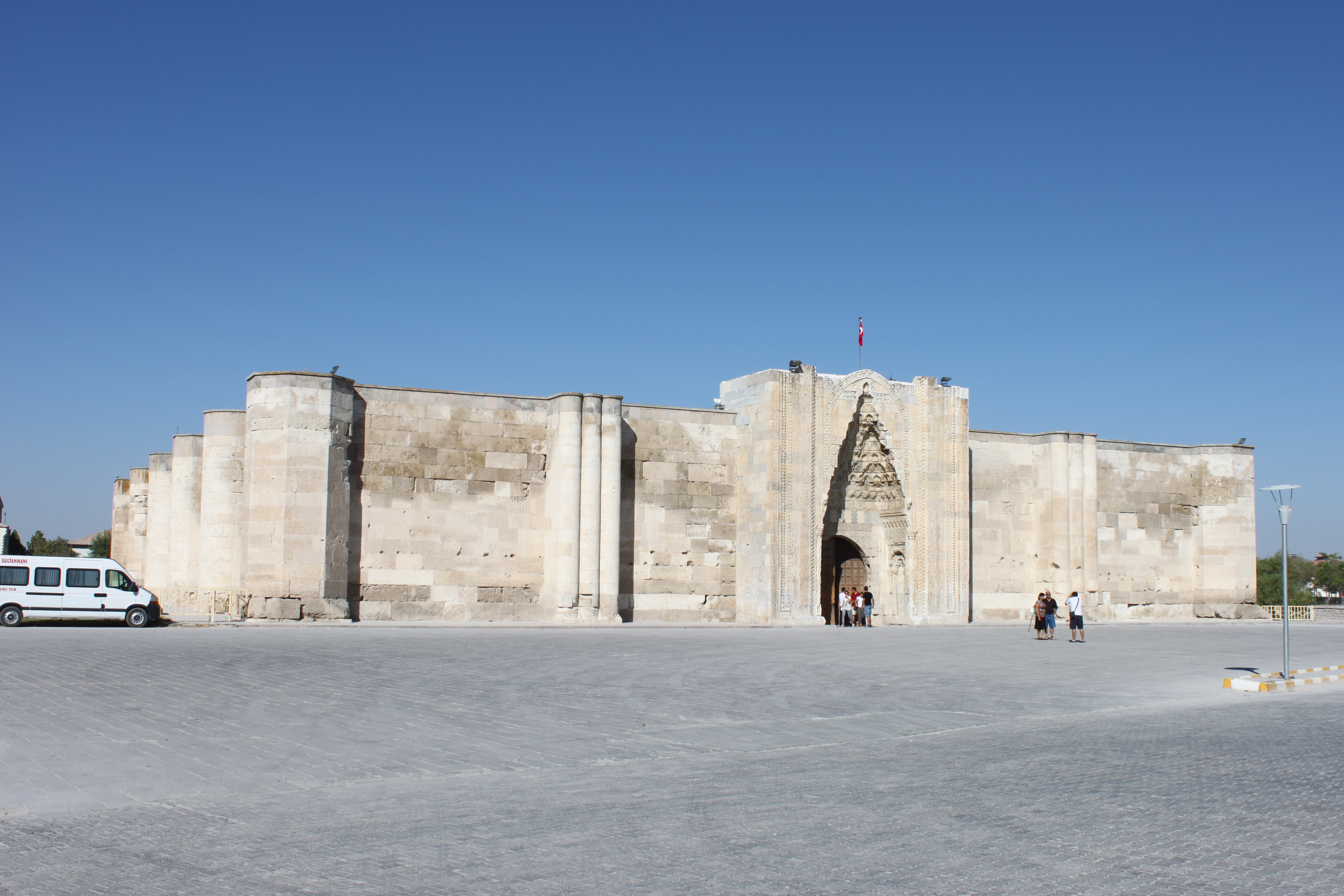
- Exterior view of the Sultan Han
- Interactive map of the Sultan Han area
- Alternative names: Sultanhanı

General information
- Type: Caravanserai
- Architectural style: Seljuk
- Location: Sultanhanı, Turkey
- Coordinates: 38.247803°N 33.546569°E
- Completed: 1229; 1278

Design and construction
- Architect: Muhammad ibn Khalwan al-Dimashqi

Sultan Han is a large and significant 13th-century Seljuk caravanserai located in the town of Sultanhanı, Aksaray Province, Turkey. It is one of the three monumental caravanserais in the neighbourhood of Aksaray and is located about 40 km (25 mi) west of Aksaray on the road to Konya.

== History ==
This fortified structure was built in 1229 (dated by inscription), during the reign of the Seljuk sultan Kayqubad I (r. 1220–1237), along the Uzun Yolu (lit. long road) trade route leading from Konya to Aksaray and continuing into Persia. After it was partially destroyed by a fire, it was restored and extended in 1278 by the governor Seraceddin Ahmed Kerimeddin bin El Hasan during the reign of the sultan Kaykhusraw III.

== Description ==
The caravanserai is considered one of the best examples of Seljuk architecture in Turkey. Covering an area of 4,900 square meters, it is the largest medieval caravanserai in Turkey.

The khan is entered at the east, through a pishtaq, a 13-m-high gate made from marble, which projects from the front wall (itself 50 m wide). The pointed arch enclosing the gate is decorated with muqarnas corbels and a geometrically patterned plaiting. This main gate leads into a 44 x 58 m open courtyard that was used in the summer. A similarly decorated archway on the far side of the open courtyard, with a muqarnas niche, joggled voussoirs and interlocking geometric designs, leads to a covered courtyard (iwan), which was for winter use. The central aisle of the covered hall has a barrel-vaulted ceiling with transverse ribs, with a short dome-capped tower over the center of the vault. The dome has an oculus to provide air and light to the hall.

A square stone kiosk-mosque (köşk mescidi), the oldest example in Turkey, is located in the middle of the open courtyard. A construction of four carved barrel-vaulted arches supports the mosque on the second floor. The central mosque, supported by elegantly carved arches, contains a highly ornate mihrab, symbolizing spiritual guidance for visitors. (Qibla direction marker), and is lit by two windows. Stables with accommodation above were located in the arcades on both sides of the inner courtyard.

== Cultural and commercial significance ==
Sultan Han, located strategically along the Silk Road, was integral to the Seljuk Empire's efforts to bolster trade across Anatolia. These caravanserais served not only as secure stops for caravans carrying goods between Europe and Asia but also as vibrant exchange points for diverse cultural practices. Reflecting the architectural austerity typical of Seljuk design, Sultan Han's high stone walls and elaborate main portal were designed to secure and accommodate the caravans and their cargoes. Facilities like a mescit, hamam, and refectory catered to travelers' needs, emphasizing the Seljuks' commitment to facilitating trade and cultural exchange. Funded through pious endowments, these caravanserais offered free food, fodder, and lodging, showcasing the grandeur of Seljuk hospitality and their sophisticated approach to supporting commerce and cultural interaction. Sultan Han stands out as a premier example, with its preservation contributing significantly to our understanding of the period's architectural and commercial strategies.

== Gallery ==
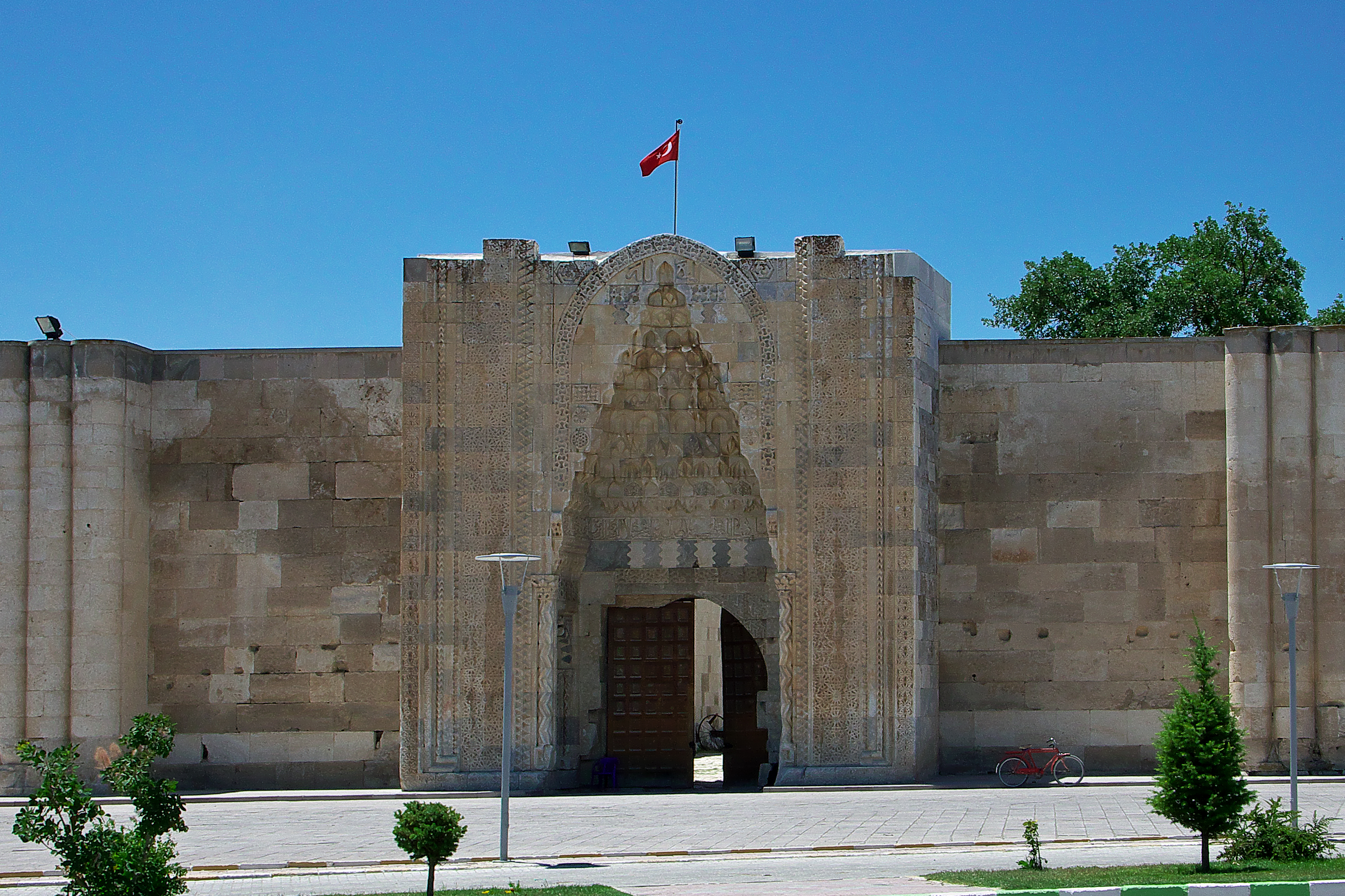
Main entrance portal

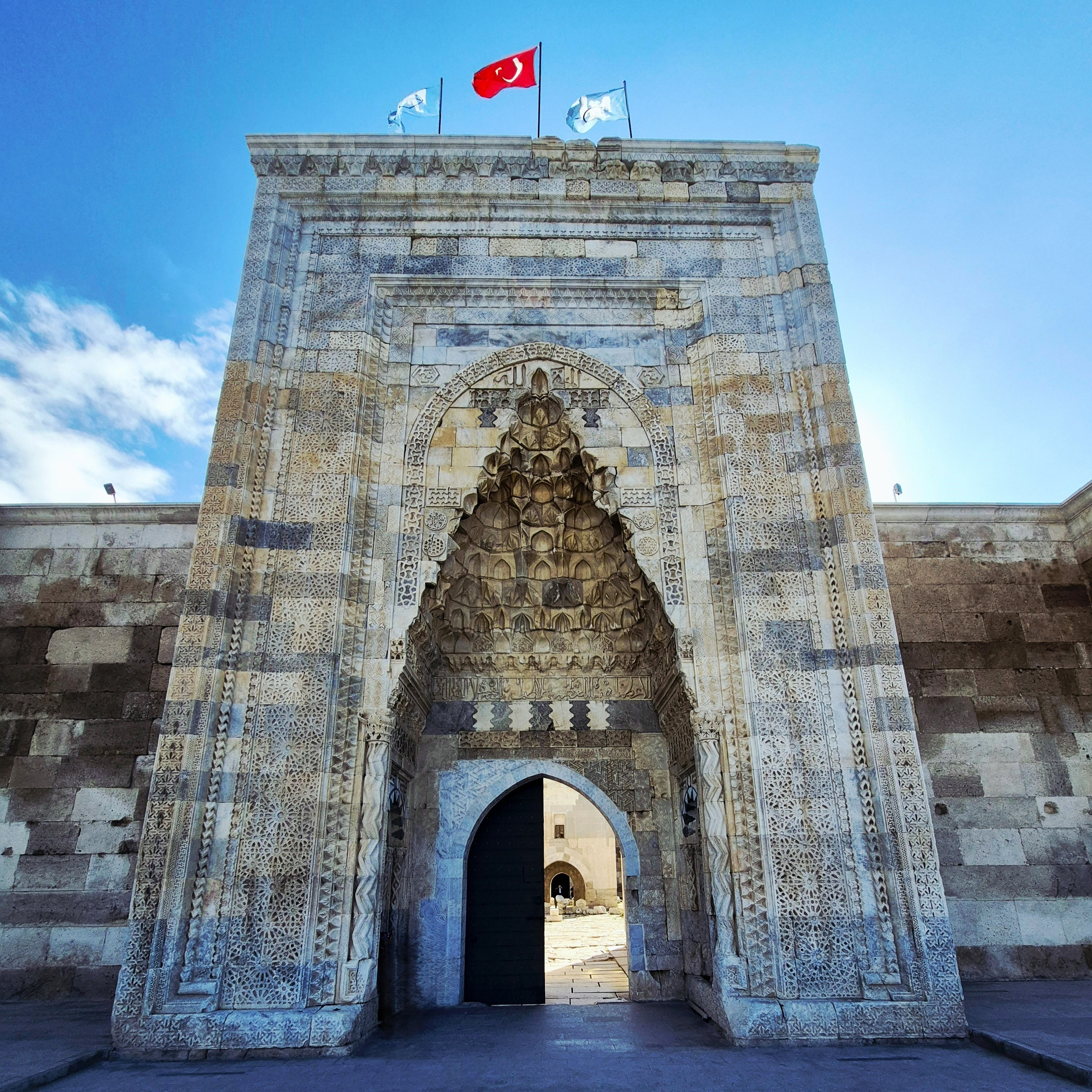
Main entrance gate, 2025

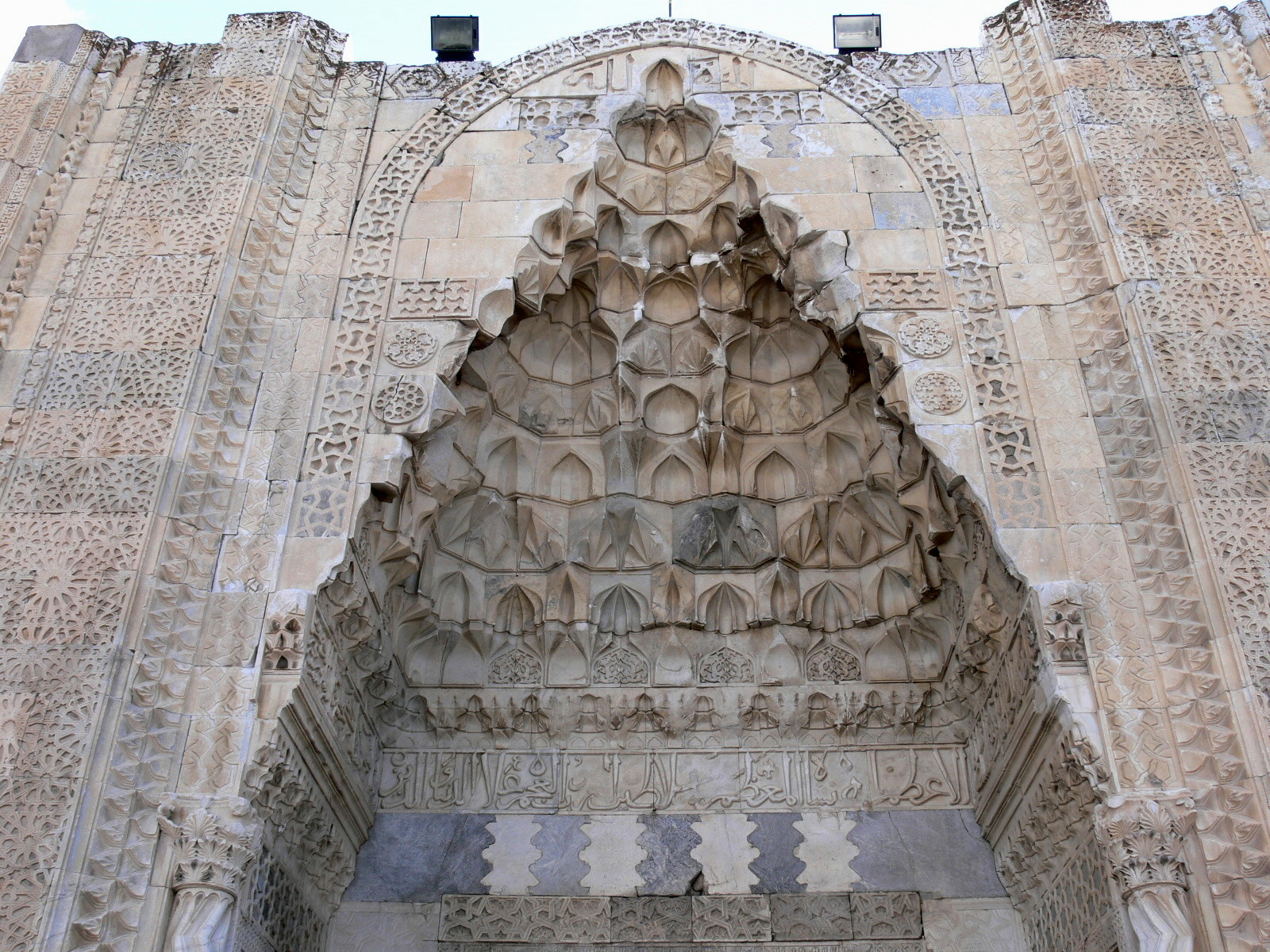
Muqarnas vaulting of the main portal

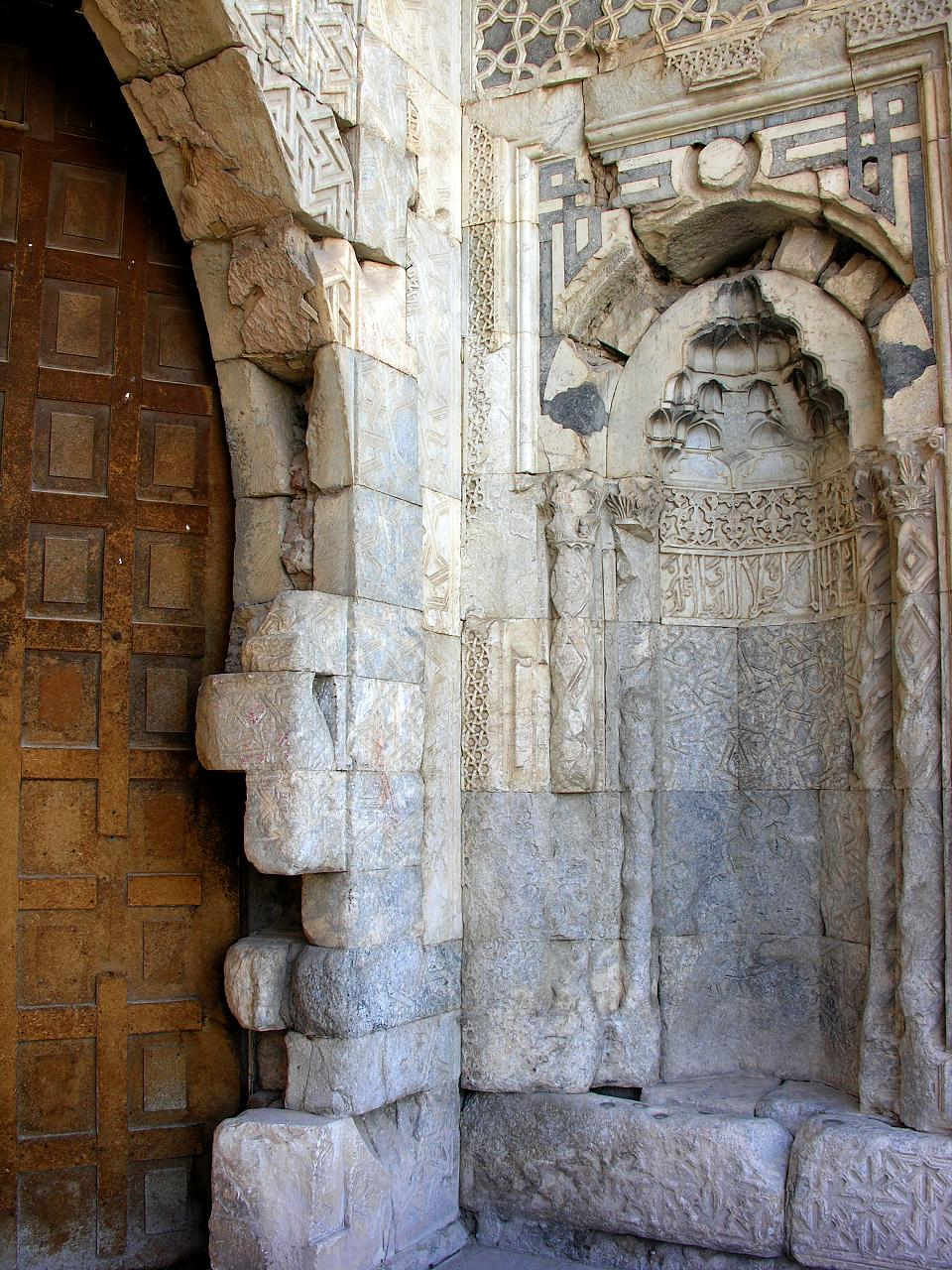
Decorative niche in the main portal

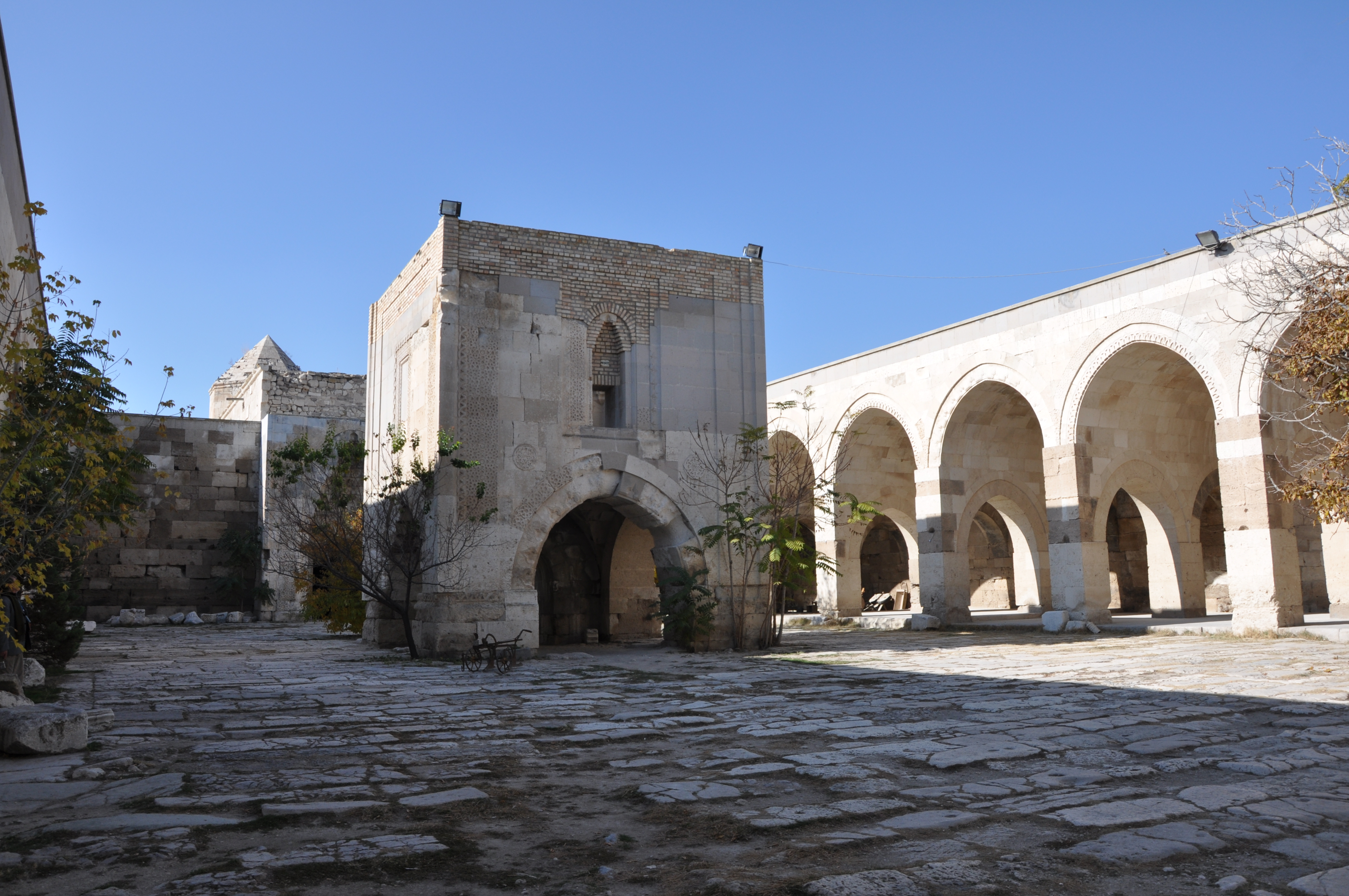
Main interior courtyard

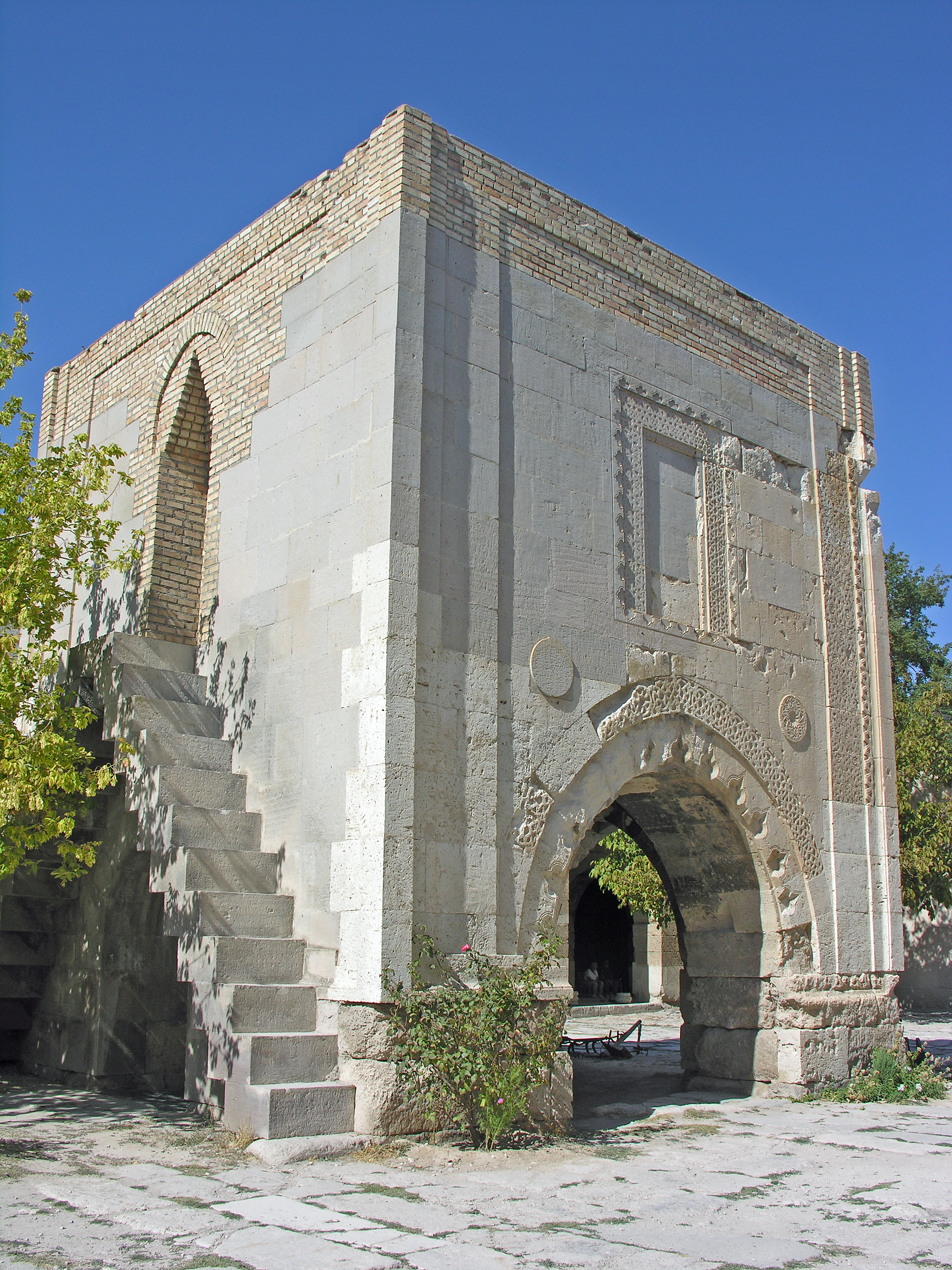
Square stone kiosk-mosque of Sultan Han

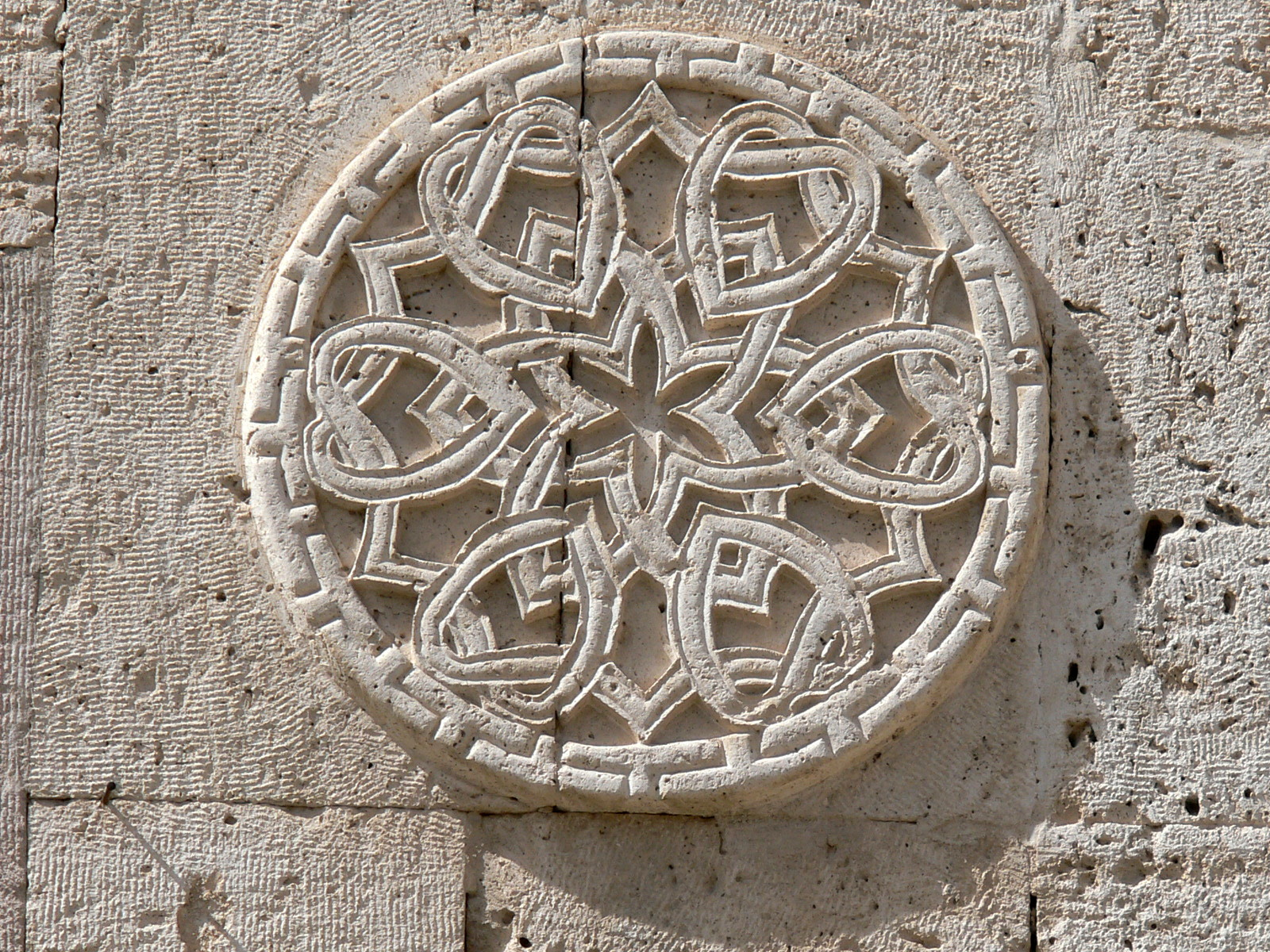
Detail of ornamental stonework on kiosk mosque

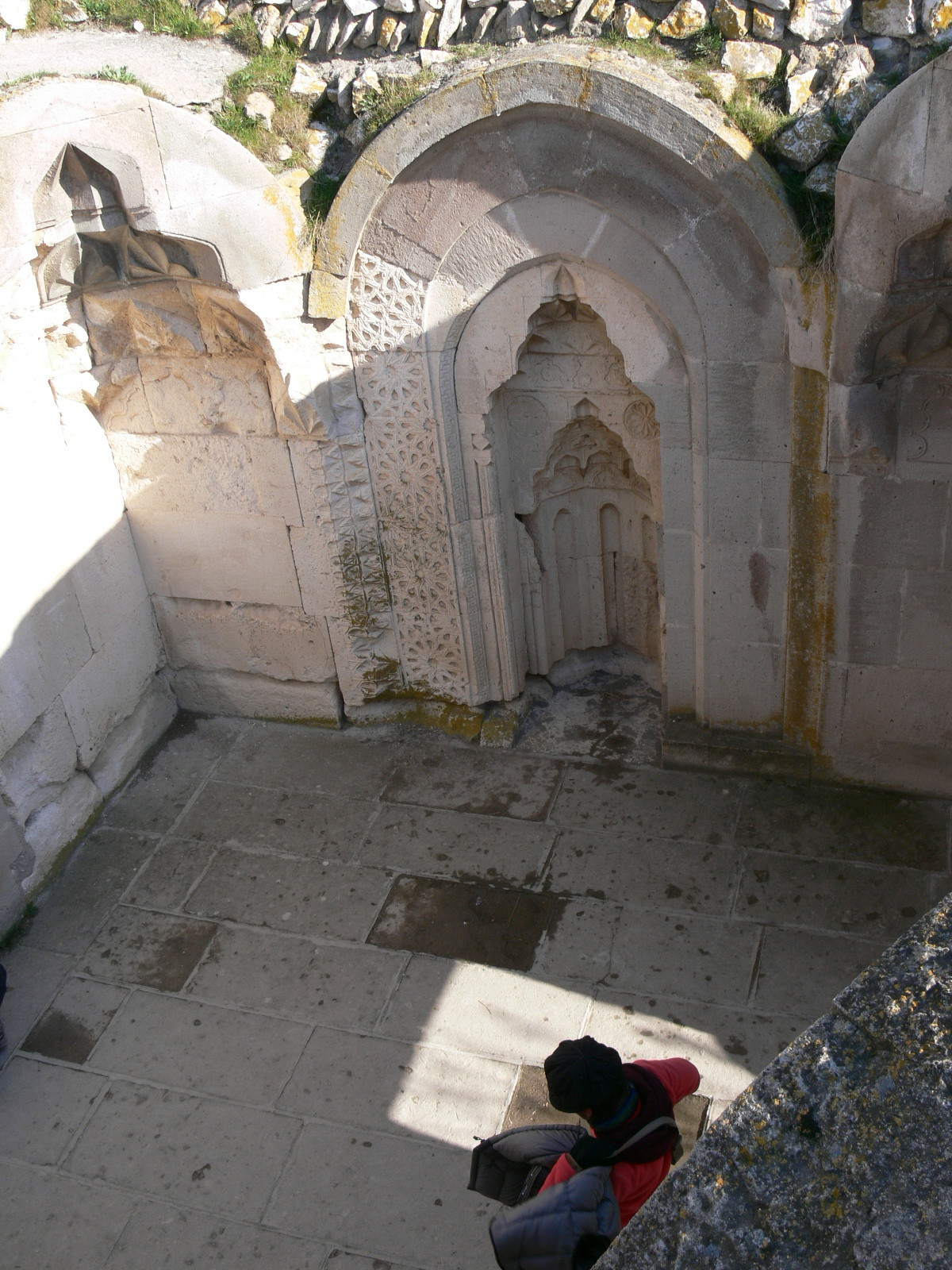
Interior of the mosque, including the mihrab

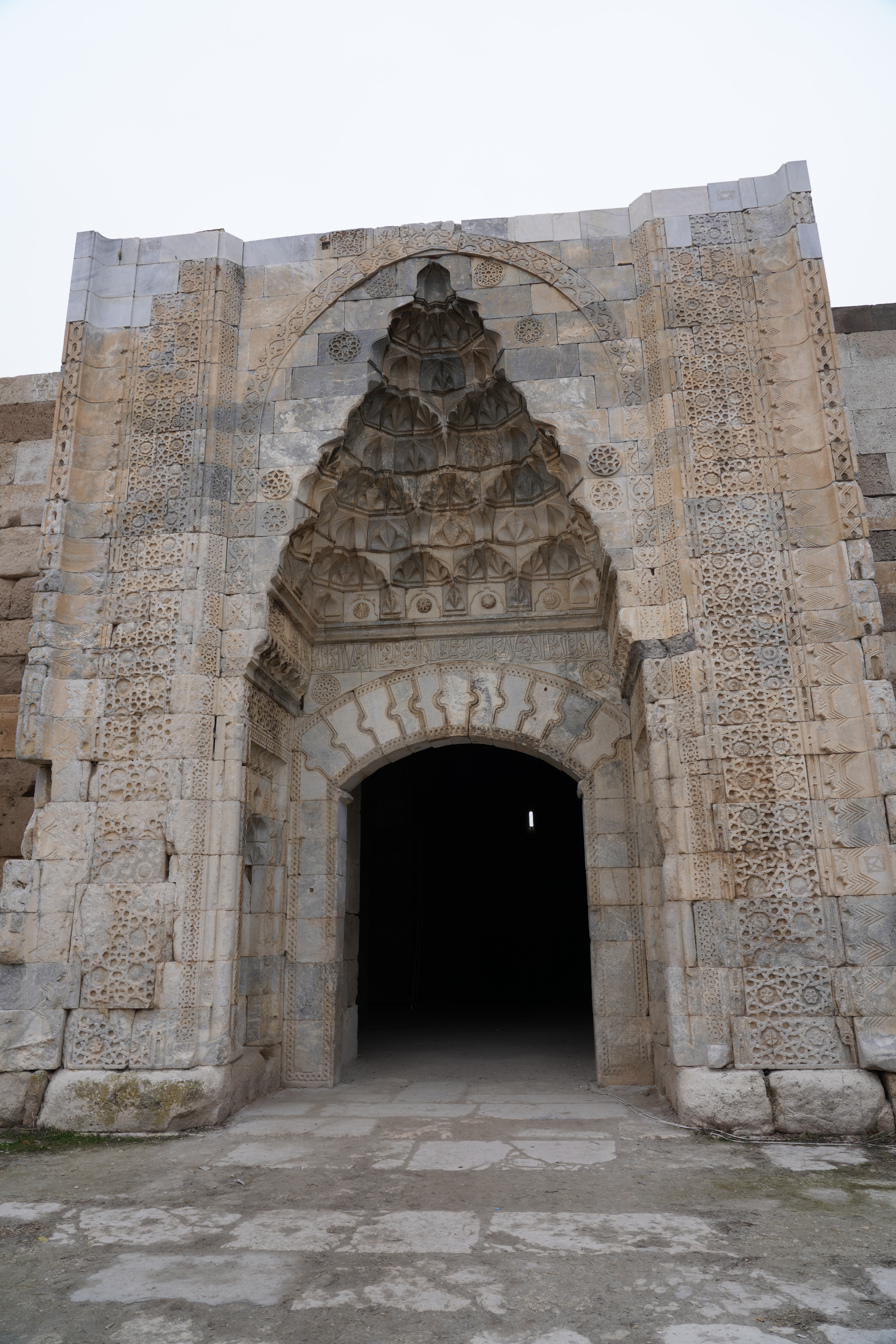
Entrance portal of the interior (winter) chambers

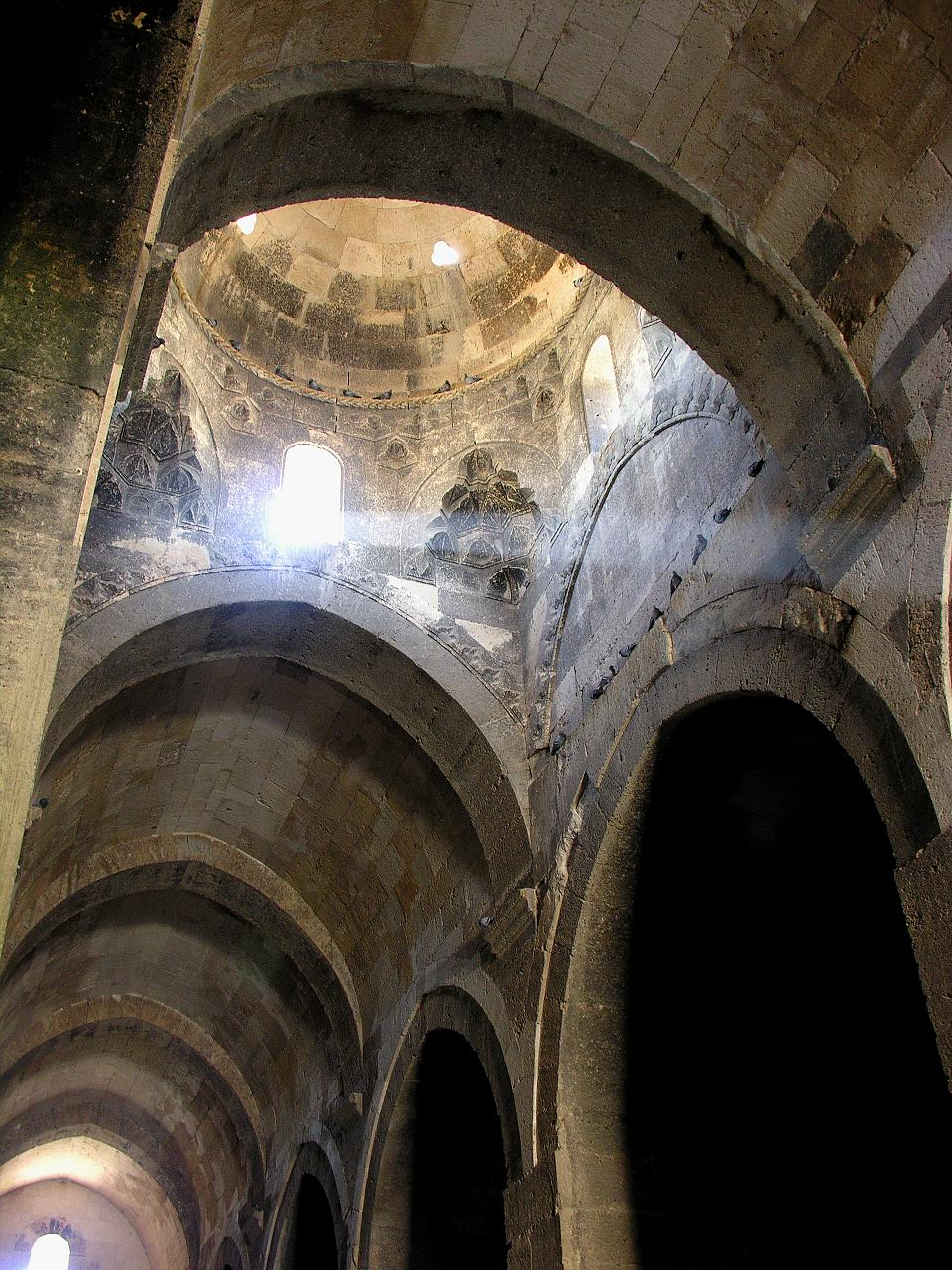
Vaults and dome in the interior (winter) chambers

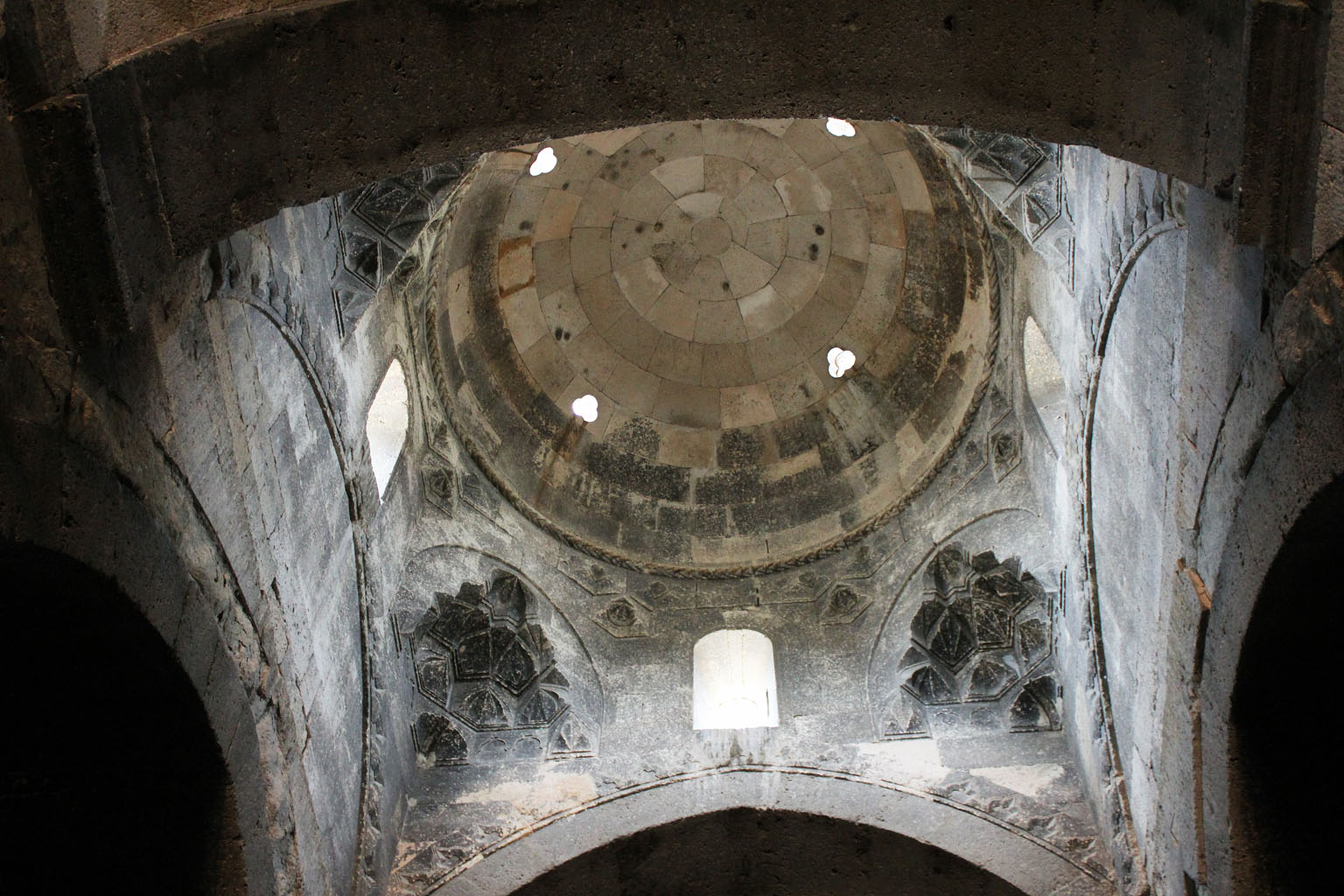
Oculus in the dome which provides air and light to the hall.

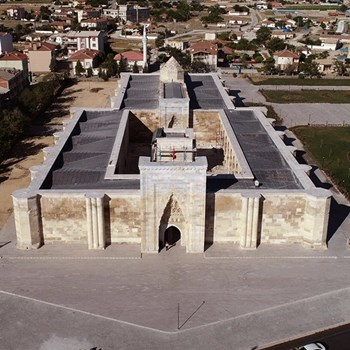
Top view of Sultanhani caravanserai aksaray

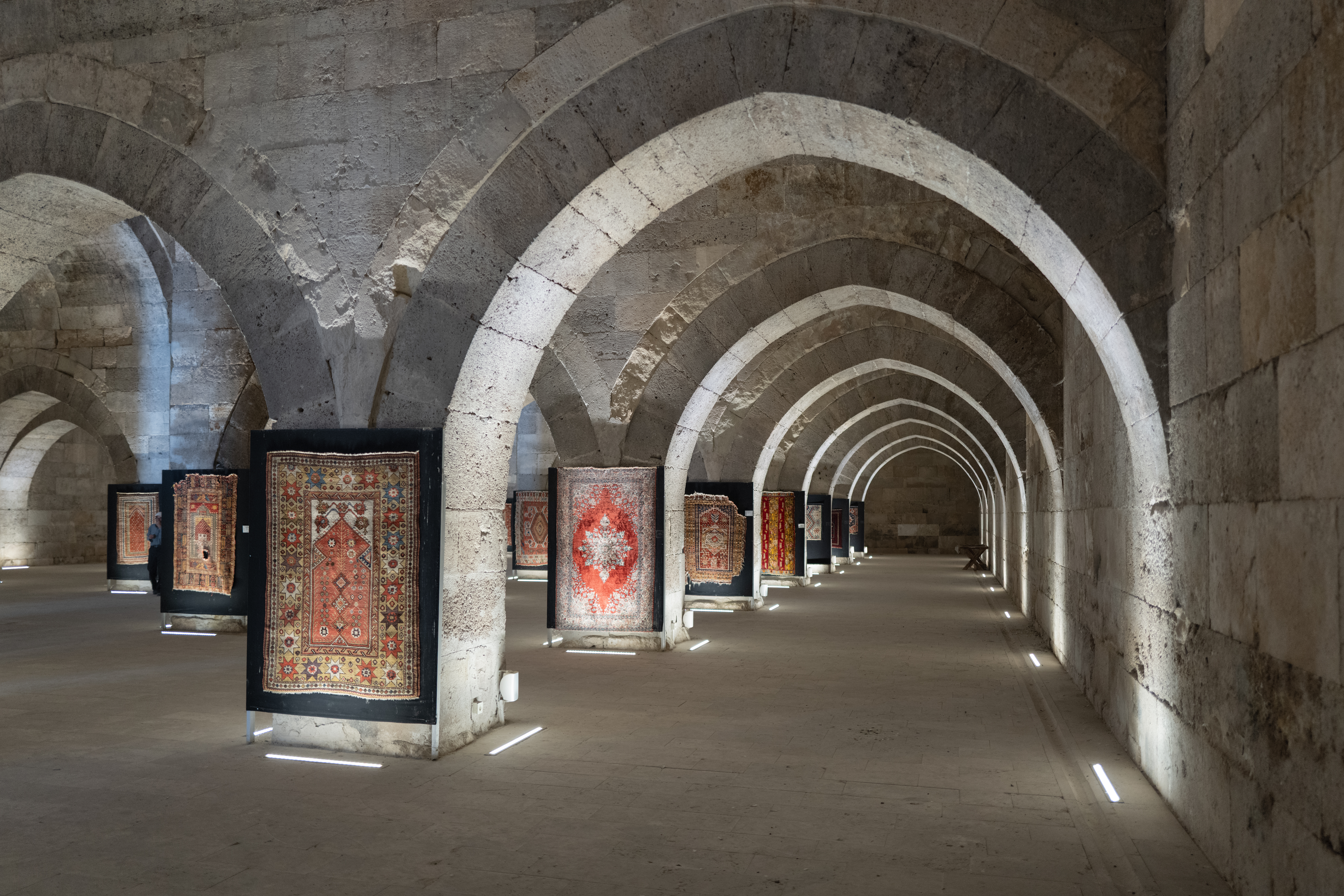
Interior of the Sultan Han

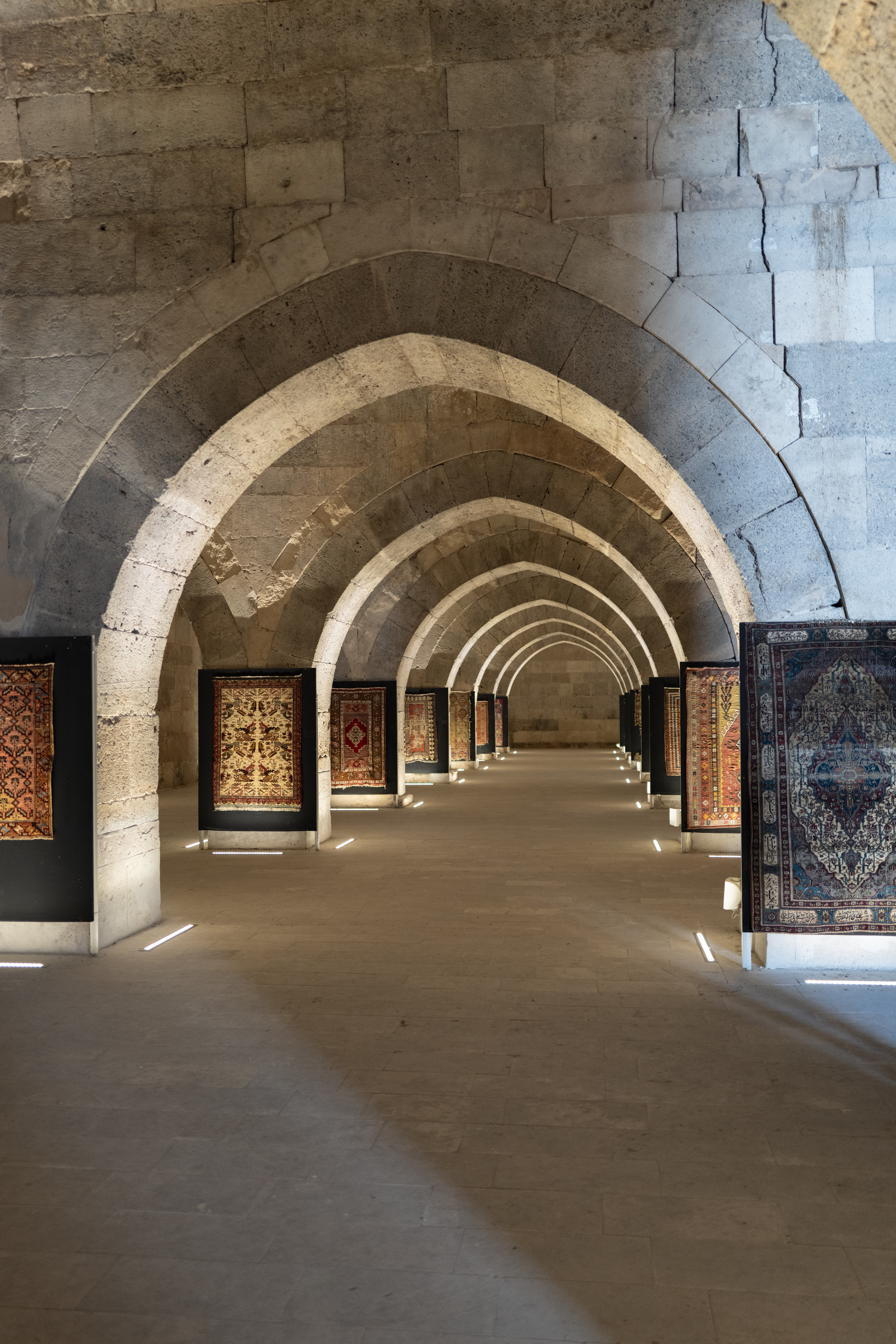
Interior of the Sultan Han

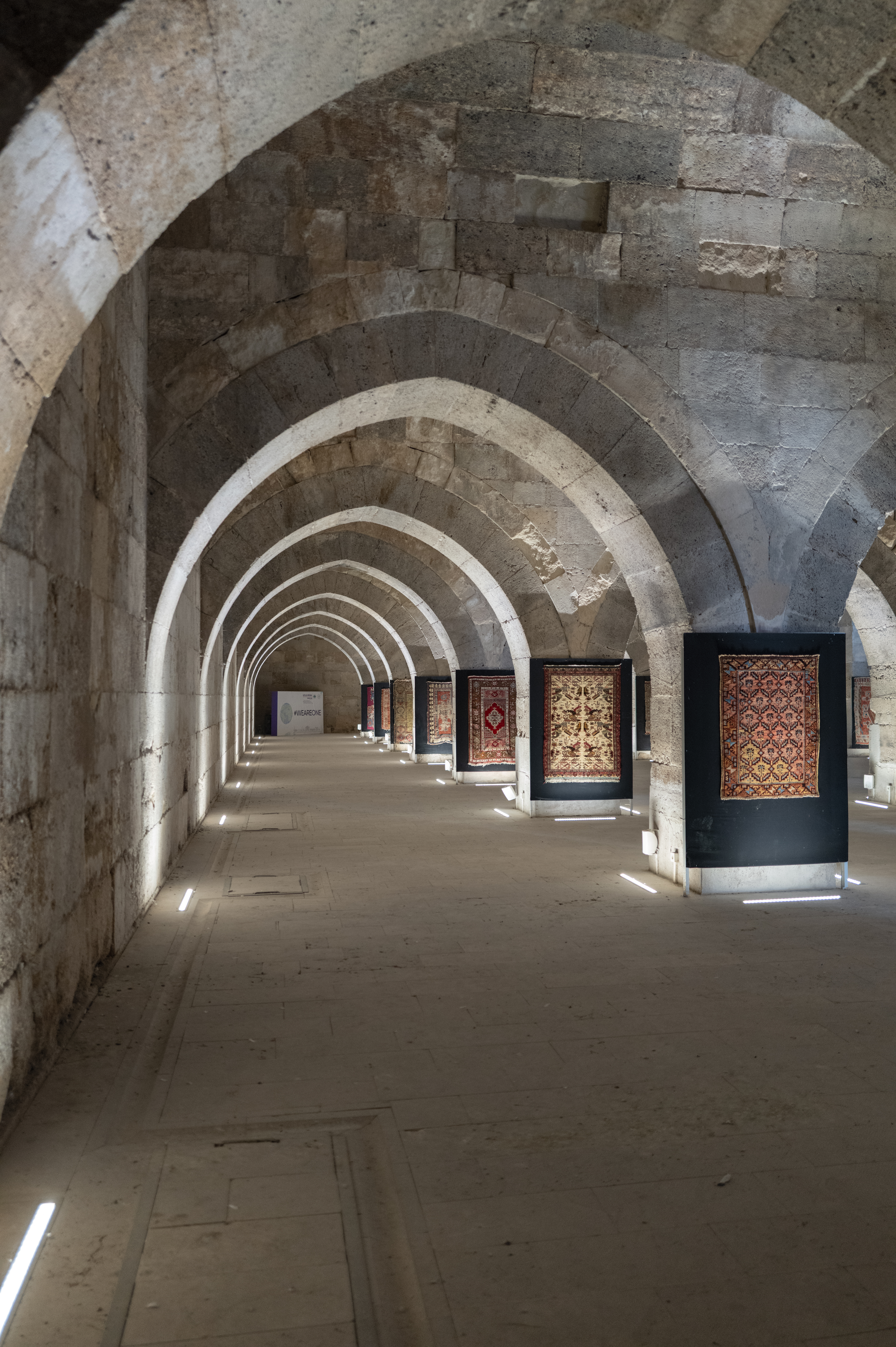
Interior of the Sultan Han

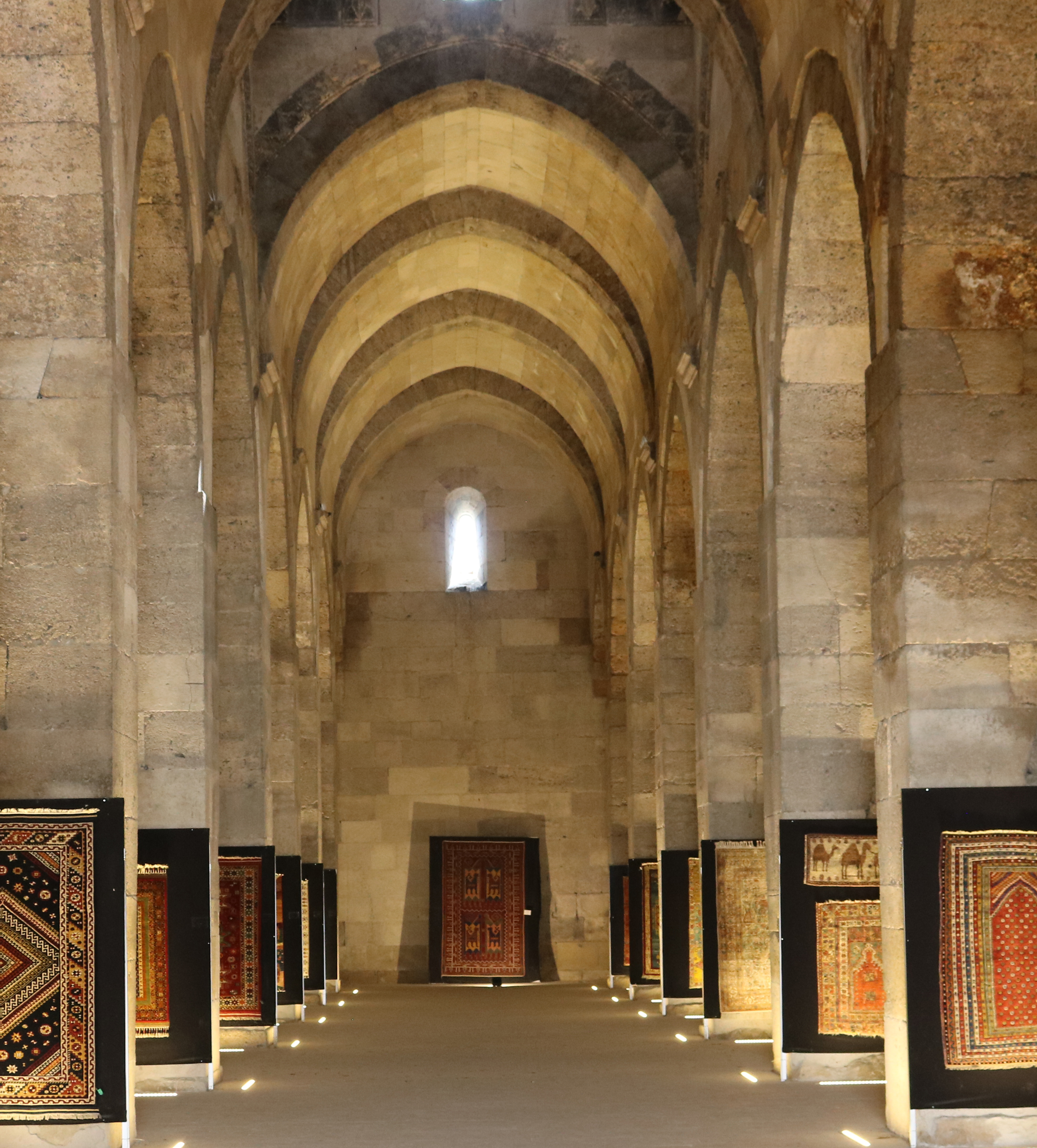
Interior view of the caravanserai

== See also ==
- List of Seljuk hans and kervansarays in Turkey
