= Reformed Church, Rakacaszend =

Reformed Church of Rakacaszend
- Rakacaszendi református templom (Hungarian)
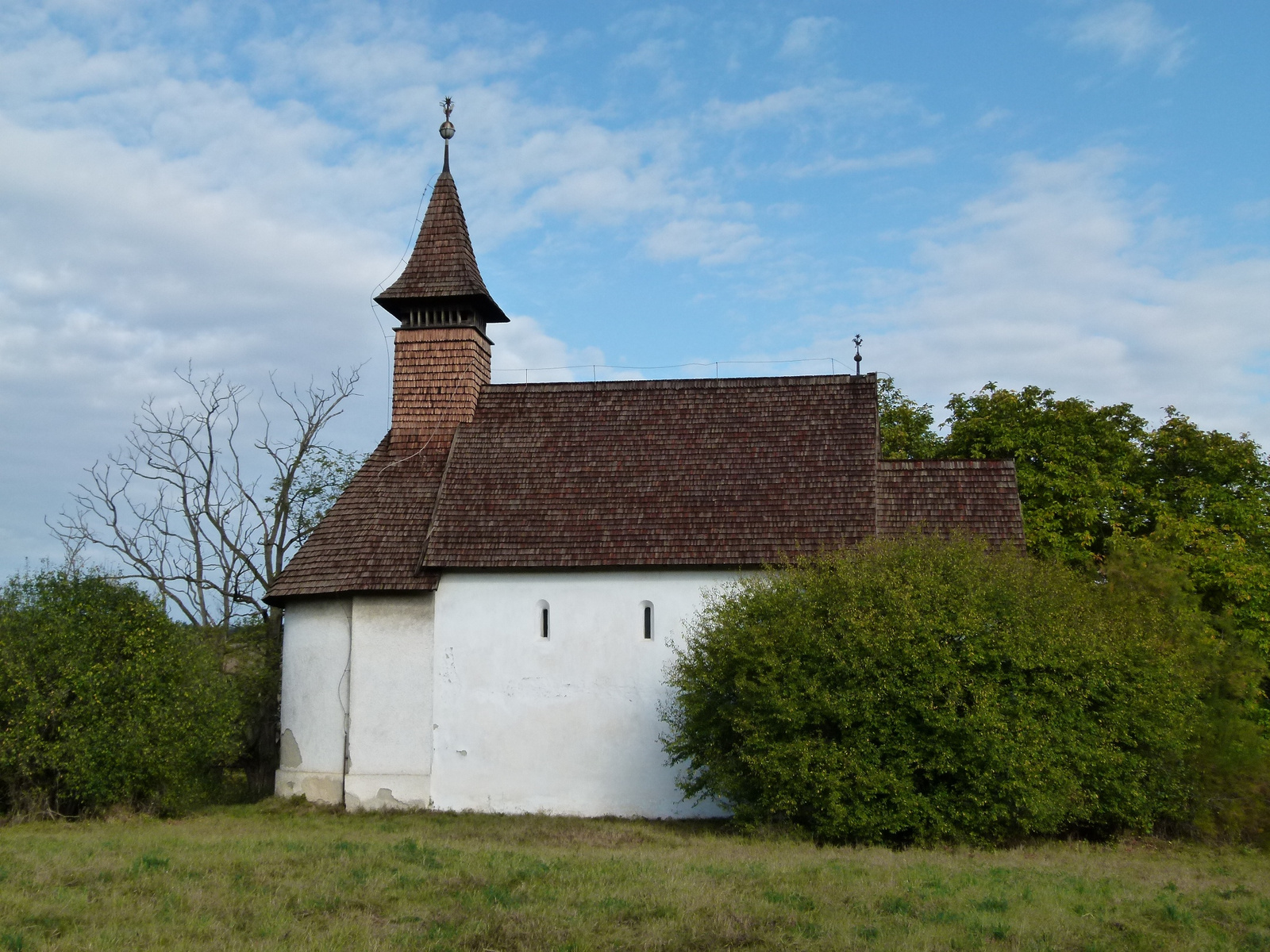

- Location within Hungary
- Location: Rakacaszend
- Country: Hungary
- Denomination: Reformed Christianity
- Previous denomination: Catholic

Architecture
- Heritage designation: Protected National Monument
- Designated: 1964
- Style: Romanesque
- Years built: 13th century

Administration
- District: Cistibiscan Church District
- Parish: Reformed Congregation of Martonyi

The Reformed Church of Rakacaszend (Hungarian: Rakacaszendi református templom) is a 13th-century Protestant church in Rakacaszend, Hungary. Until the 19th century, it was one of Hungary’s rare twin churches.

== History ==
The history of the church remained unknown until 1960. A lightning strike caused the plaster to fall away, revealing fragments of frescoes beneath. Excavation and restoration work began in 1972; it was determined that two Romanesque-era churches had been built side by side on this site. Next to a small brick church built in the 12th century, and using its southern side wall, a slightly larger stone church was later constructed. Thus, the two buildings were connected by a shared wall.

In the 16th century, as a result of the Reformation, the village's population converted to Calvinism and took over the double church, which was still Catholic at the time.

Reports from 1746 and 1769 still described it as a double church; in the latter year, only the larger of the two was used by the Reformed congregation. The smaller church was demolished in 1820; the other one was expanded with an arched addition, and a tower was erected above the arch.

== Gallery ==

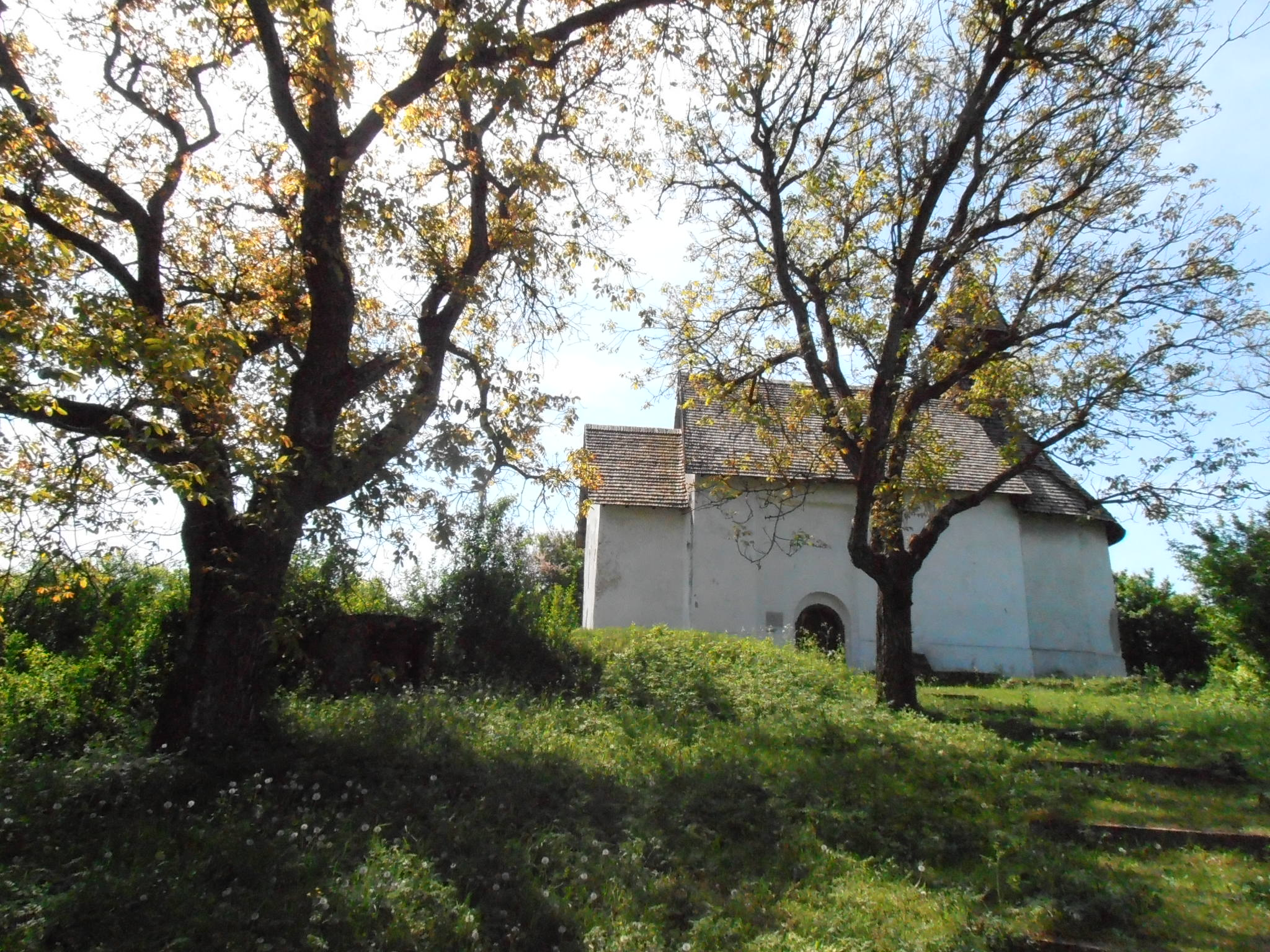

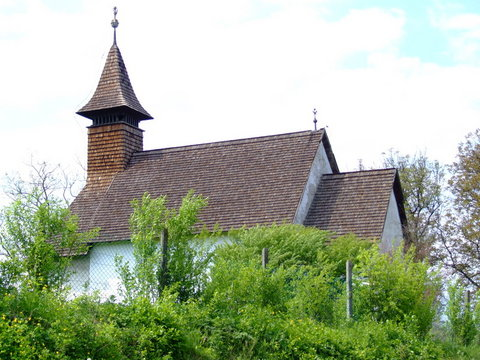

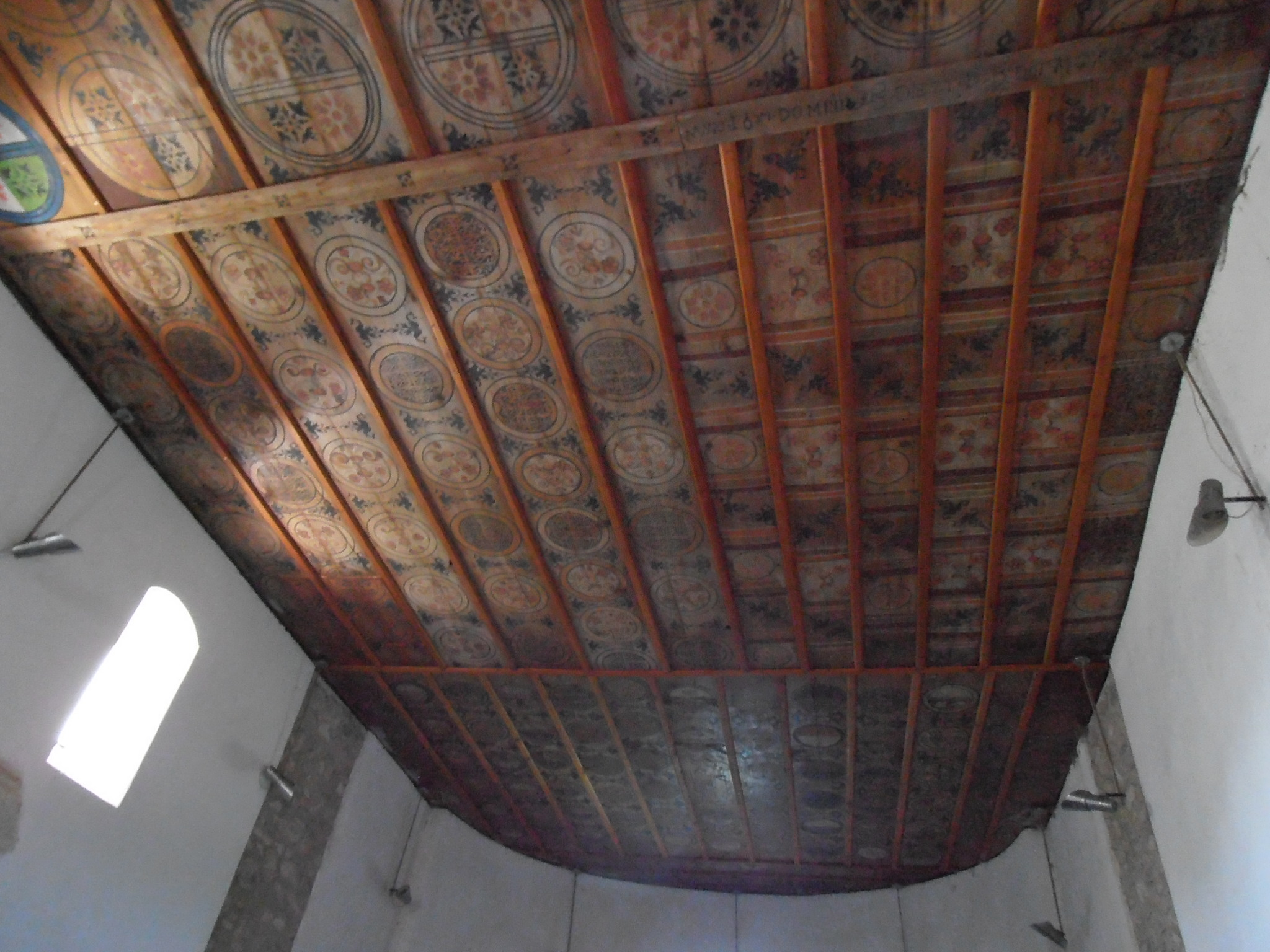
Wooden ceiling

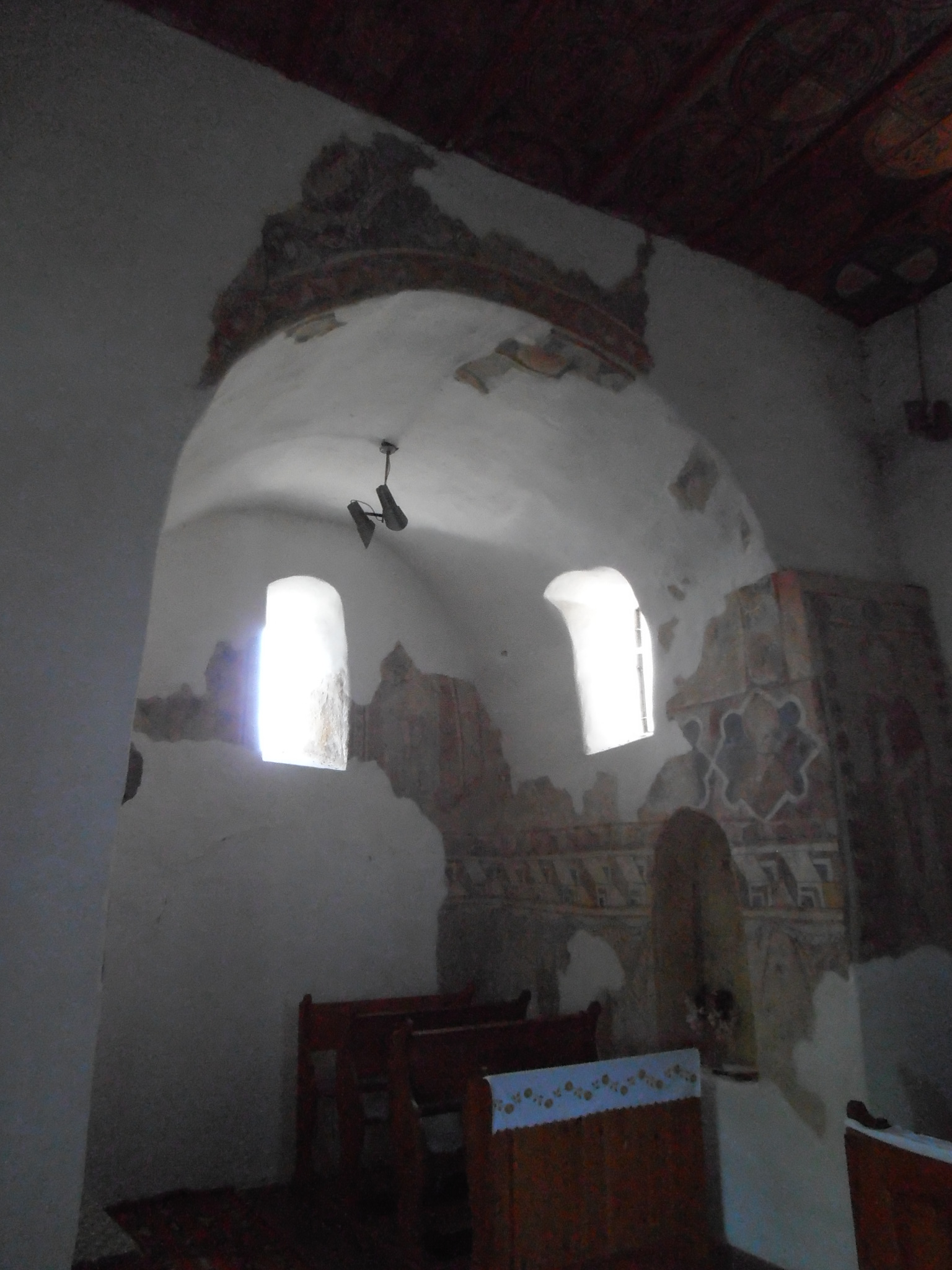
Remains of medieval frescoes

== See also ==
- Reformed Church in Hungary
- Rakacaszend
