= Üçayak Byzantine Church =

- Üçayak Kilisesi
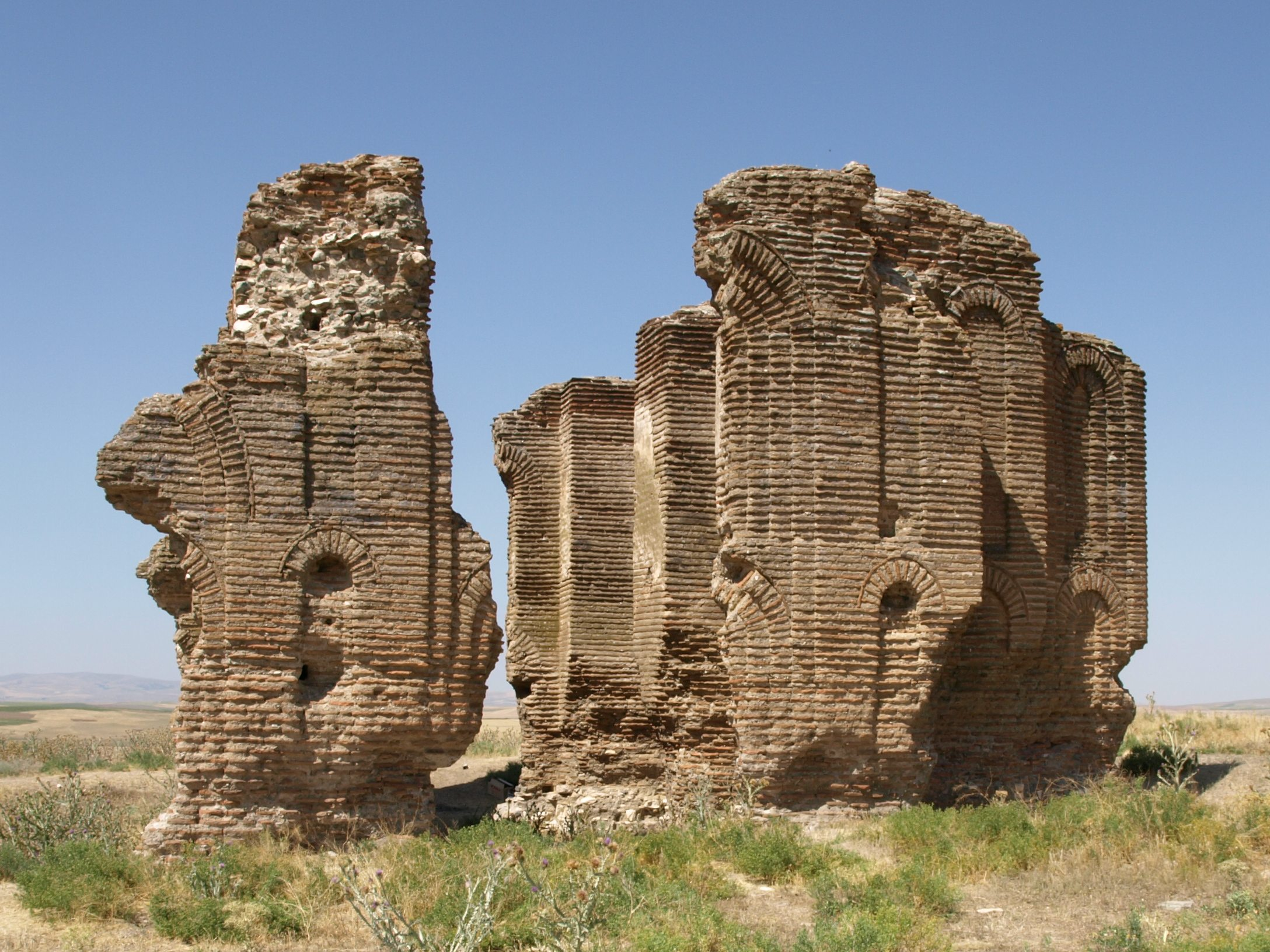
- The ruins of the Üçayak Byzantine Church. The decorative niches on its exterior walls are visible.
- Üçayak Byzantine Church
- 39°24′46″N 34°10′15″E
- Location: Cappadocia; Taburoğlu (nearest settlement), Kırşehir Province
- Country: Turkey
- Denomination: Eastern Orthodox

Architecture
- Functional status: ruined
- Heritage designation: Immovable Cultural Property of Turkey
- Designated: 23 June 1994
- Architectural type: Church
- Style: Byzantine
- Years built: 10th–11th centuries

Specifications
- Length: 17 metres (55 ft 9 in)
- Materials: Brick

The ruins of the Üçayak Byzantine Church (Turkish: Üçayak Kilisesi; "Three-legged Church") are found in Kırşehir Province in Central Anatolia, Turkey. The church is unique in several respects. It is built on a remote location, without any evidence of any artefacts in the surrounding area, apparently in a completely isolated place, with no signs of human habitation.

Its architectural design has been described as executed on an "exceptionally high artistic level". Other unusual features include a double or twin-church design, its all-brick construction (with the exception of its foundations), and its sloping walls. It has been dated to around the late 10th to 11th centuries. The style of the church is double-nave basilica.

It is located in the southern part of Kırşehir Province, near the village of Taburoğlu, which is approximately six kilometres from the Yerköy-Yozgat highway.

The church has been an Immovable Cultural Property of Turkey since 1994.

== History ==
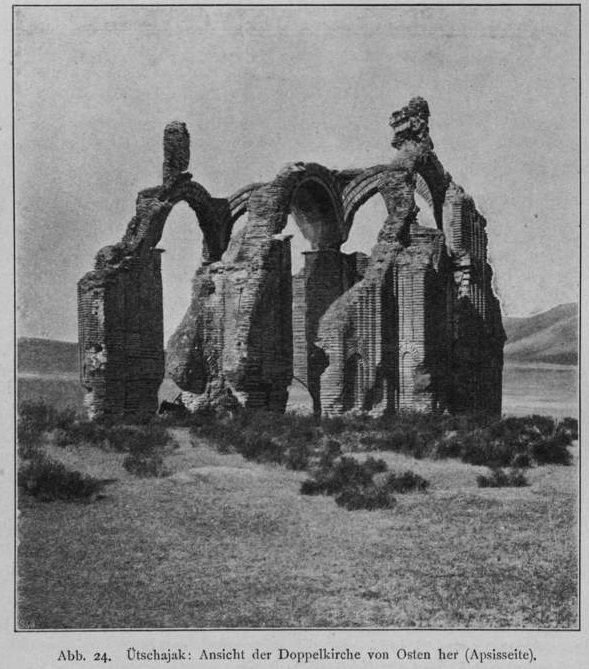
The ruins of the Üçayak Byzantine Church as they appeared in 1900. The dome arches were destroyed in an earthquake in 1938.

The Byzantine name of the location of the church is unknown. Proposed names include Justinianopolis, Pteria, and Mokissos. Taburoğlu, the closest settlement to the church was known as Tabira in antiquity. It is widely speculated to have been dedicated to Emperors Basil II (976–1025) and Constantine VIII (976–1028). Near the church, there is a water spring, but the absence of any human artefacts in the vicinity indicates that the church was built on a completely isolated and uninhabited area. One suggestion is that it commemorated the victory of Basil II over Bardas Phokas.

The remnants of the decorations of the facades, its sloping walls, and its architectural style led to its chronology being placed to late 10th or 11th centuries AD. On the Yerköy road in the north of Kırşehir, an inscription gave the name of St. Lukianos. The first report on the church was in 1842 by W. F. Ainsworth. His travel notes on the church were used by John Winter Crowfoot who visited the ruins in 1900, and were eventually published by Josef Strzygowski in 1903. The 1938 Kırşehir earthquake caused the dome arches of the church to collapse.

== Architecture ==
The construction of the church, solely using bricks as the medium, is very unusual in Byzantine architecture. The church foundation was made of stone. In 1900, John Winter Crowfoot reports a pinkish external layer covering the brick walls. In-between the walls, base material, consisting of rubble, stones and other fillers, was used. The filler material was supported by a wooden-beam structure.

=== Double naves, apses and domes ===
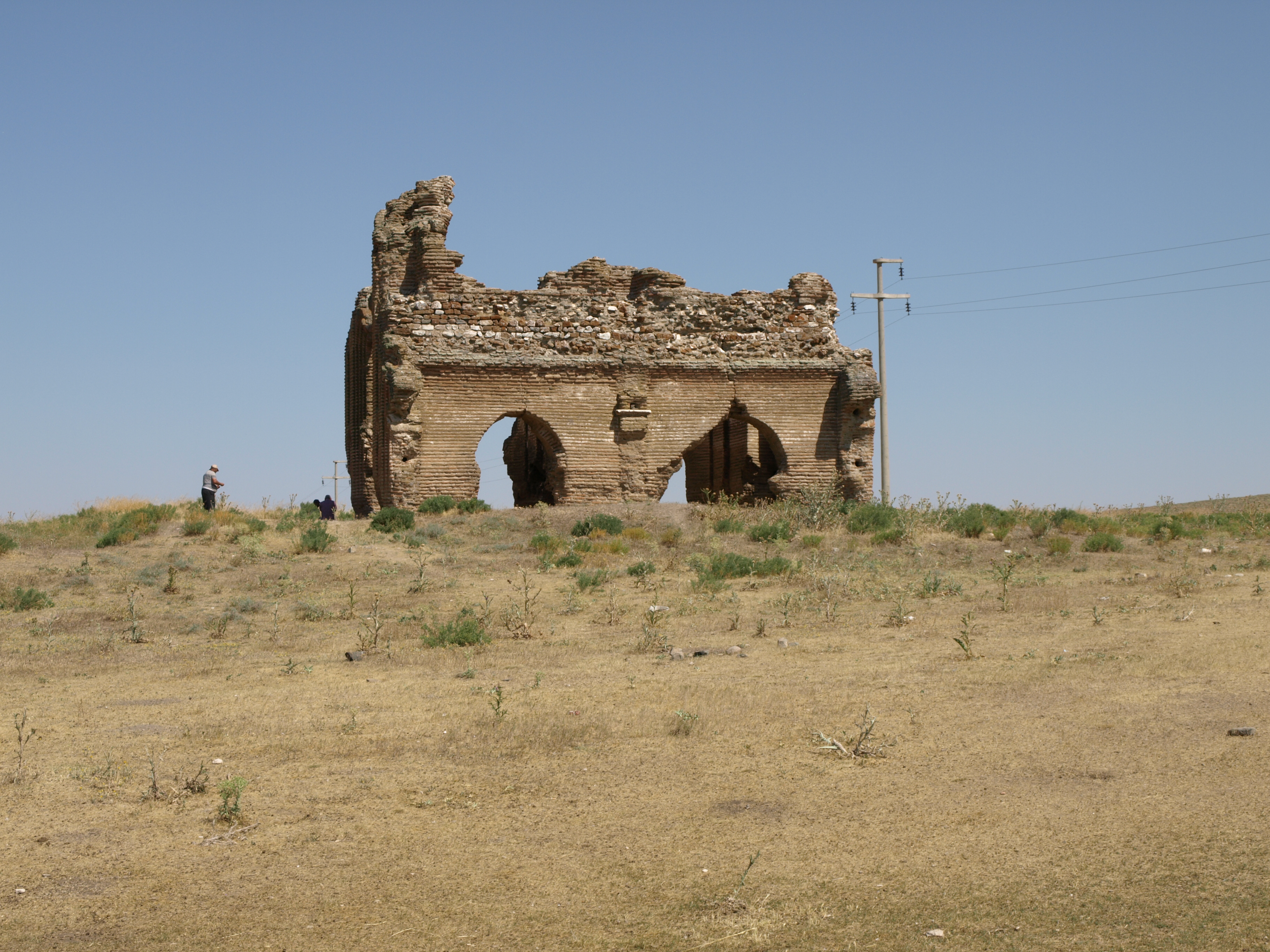
Üçayak Church in the background

The church design is very unusual for Byzantine architecture. The church is constructed as a double-church featuring two naves adjacent to each other and separated by a wall. The naves were quadrangular and each featured a separate dome. The naves have a common narthex of an oblong shape. The twin church design at Üçayak has two naves (naoi) each with a separate semi-circular apse. Each apse includes a rectangular bay in front of it.

The double-church design is even more unusual because the two churches were constructed at the same time, as opposed to being built sequentially, which was the construction method employed more often for churches of this type. Scholars speculate that the double church was constructed either in honour of two distinct saints or martyrs, or because a Byzantine emperor and his wife built it; the latter explanation being more probable, since no crypts or other artefacts, attesting to the worship of saints or martyrs, have been found.

=== Niches ===
The exterior walls are decorated by arches that recess into the walls forming niches. The same technique had been used for the church of Çanlı Kilise in Cappadocia and the Church of the Dormition of the Mother of God in Nicaea (modern-day Iznik). The recessed arches and the all-brick wall construction of the Üçayak church provided an impressive architectural element to its design.

=== Decorations ===
In 1900, John Winter Crowfoot reports faint traces of a fresco decorating a pendentive. Even at that time, it was difficult to discern any details of the theme of the fresco other than what appeared to be a series of heads with haloes. Crowfoot also reports that there were traces of two illegible inscriptions when he visited the site in 1900. The inscription may have contained clues as to the reason for building the church at such a completely isolated area.

== Restoration ==
The church is a rare example of early Byzantine period architecture in Kırşehir Province, which is considered to be located within the area occupied by ancient Cappadocia, or at the border of the Byzantine provinces of Galatia and Cappadocia. Ahi Evran University is planning restoration and conservation of the ruins.
