= Rakacaszend =

- Location of Borsod-Abaúj-Zemplén county in Hungary

- Location of Rakacaszend
- Coordinates: 48.46088°N 20.83764°E
- Country: Hungary
- County: Borsod-Abaúj-Zemplén

Area
  - Total: 15.71 km^{2} (6.07 sq mi)

Population (2004)
  - Total: 368
  - Density: 23.42/km^{2} (60.7/sq mi)
- Time zone: UTC+1 (CET)
  - Summer (DST): UTC+2 (CEST)
- Postal code: 3826
- Area code: 48

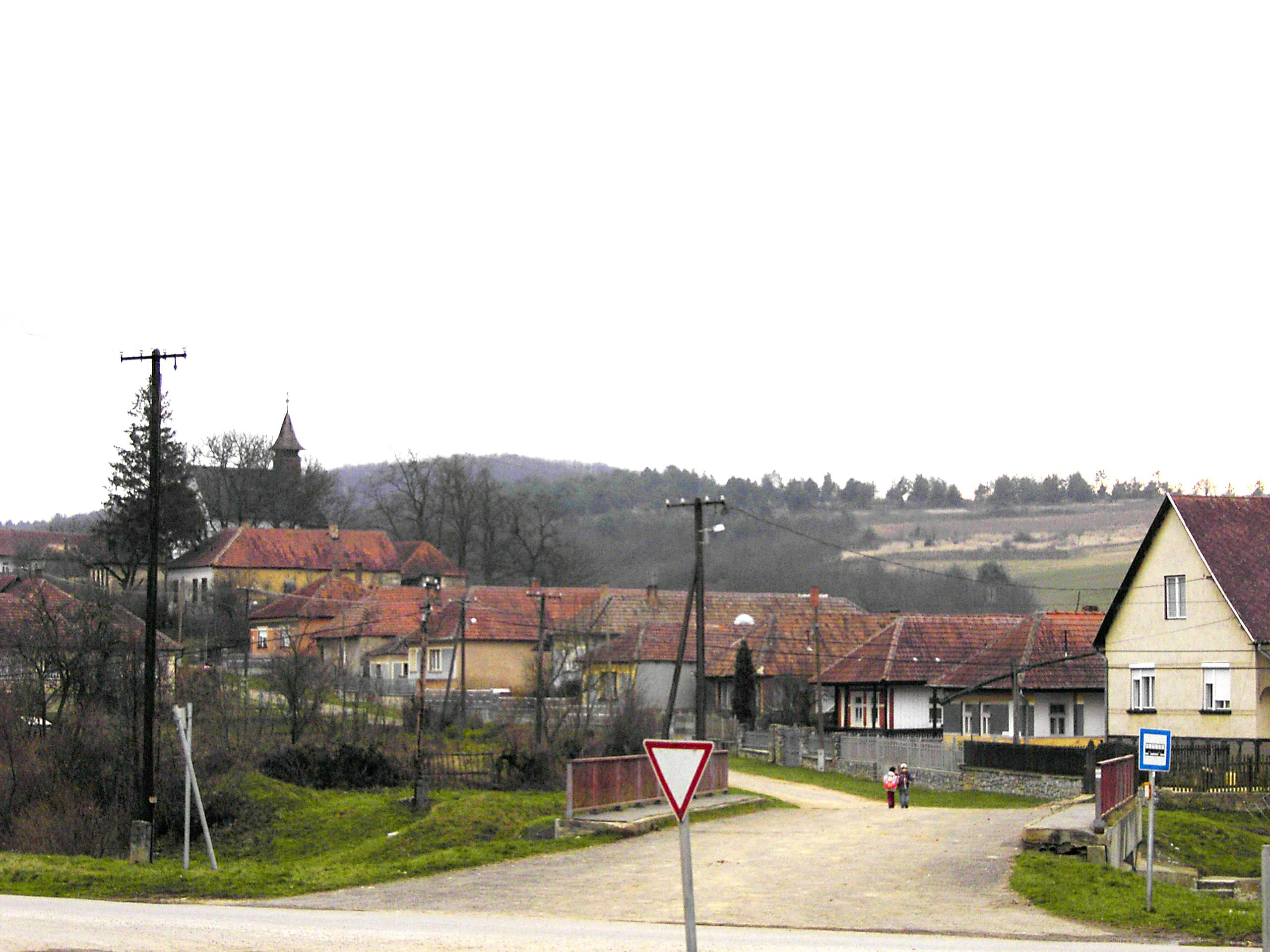
Rakacaszend with the medieval church

Rakacaszend is a village in Borsod-Abaúj-Zemplén county, Hungary. It is located in the hilly Cserehát region. The village is famous for its medieval church.

== History ==
The old name of the village was Szend, occurring as "Zenth" in old charters, meaning saint. Its church was first mentioned in the 14th century. The landowner of the village was the Szendi family. The village was destroyed after the capture of Buda in the Turkish wars in the 16th century. In the early years of the 17th century it was repopulated by the new landowners, the Lorántffy and the Rákóczi family.

== Sights ==
The building of the church happened in two periods. In the 12th century the northern nave was built, which later was destroyed and the new building was built by the southern wall of the old church in the 13th century. Such double church can be found in ruin form at Dörgicse, Balaton-highland. In the Rakacaszend church old murals were found from the 15th century. During Reformation the church was transformed to the needs of the Calvinist requests and a new tower was built in 1820. The ceiling cassettes were painted in 1657. The furniture is from the 17th century, the Moses-chair was carved in 1824.
