= Double church =

Church design found in Byzantine architecture

- Geographical indication
- Description: Double naves standing side by side and separated by a common wall
- Type: Church design
- Area: Byzantine

A double church, or twin church, is a church design found in Byzantine architecture. The double church design of the Üçayak Byzantine Church features double naves standing side by side and separated by a common wall. The twin church design at Üçayak has two naves each with a separate semi-circular apse. Each apse includes a rectangular bay in front of it.
