= Christianity in late antiquity =

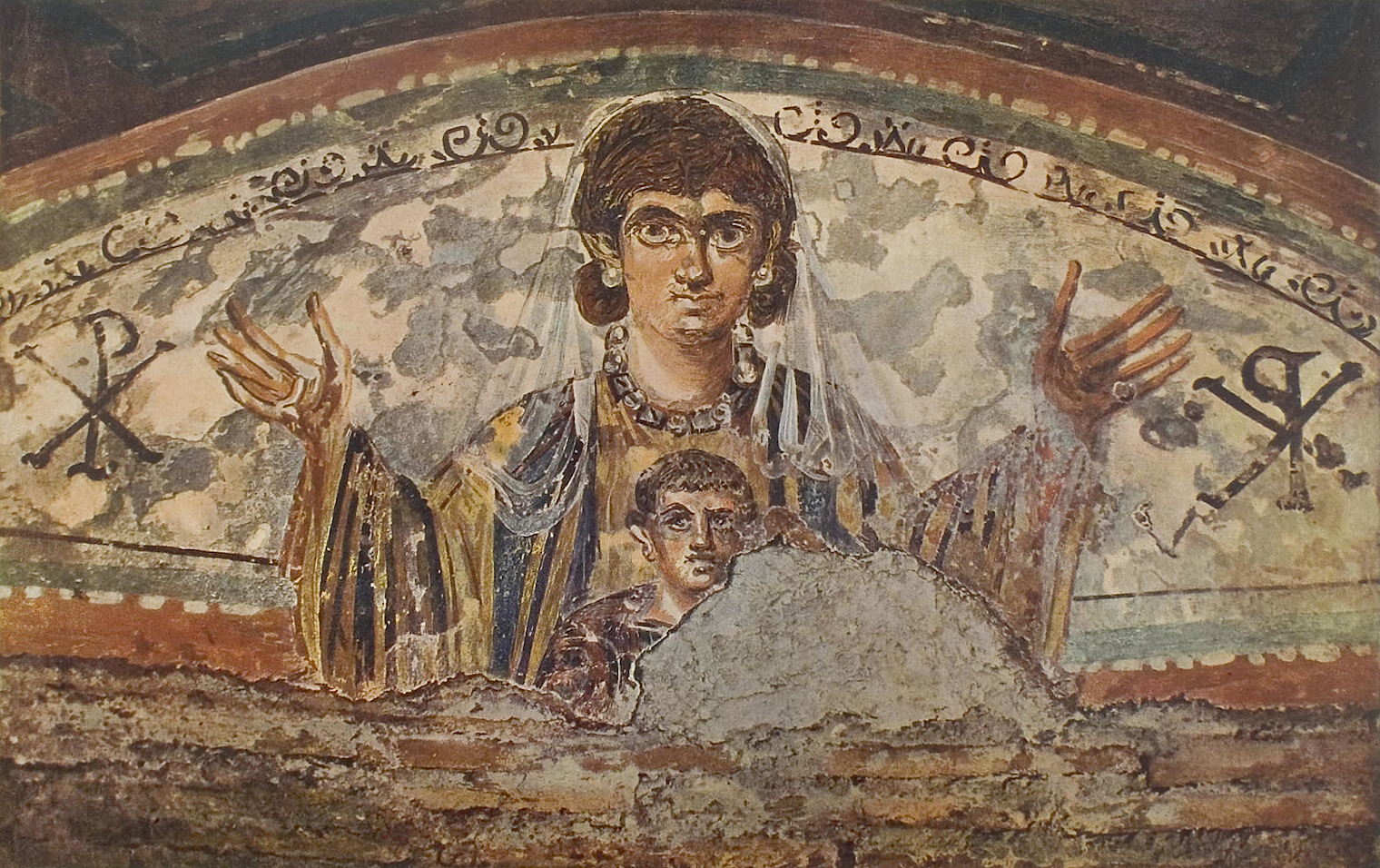
Virgin and Child. Wall painting from the catacombs, Rome, 4th century.

Christianity in late antiquity traces Christianity during the Christian Roman Empire — the period from the rise of Christianity under Emperor Constantine (c. 313), until the fall of the Western Roman Empire (c. 476). The end-date of this period varies because the transition to the sub-Roman period occurred gradually and at different times in different areas. One may generally date late ancient Christianity as lasting to the late 6th century and the re-conquests under Justinian (reigned 527–565) of the Byzantine Empire, though a more traditional end-date is 476, the year in which Odoacer deposed Romulus Augustus, traditionally considered the last western emperor.

Christianity began to spread initially from Roman Judaea without state support or endorsement. It became the state religion of Armenia in either 301 or 314, of Ethiopia in 325, and of Georgia in 337. With the Edict of Thessalonica it became the state religion of the Roman Empire in 380.

== Persecution and legalisation ==
The Edict of Serdica was issued in 311 by the Roman emperor Galerius, officially ending the Diocletianic persecution of Christianity in the East. With the passage in 313 AD of the Edict of Milan, in which the Roman Emperors Constantine the Great and Licinius legalised the Christian religion, persecution of Christians by the Roman state ceased.

The Emperor Constantine I was exposed to Christianity by his mother, Helena. There is scholarly controversy, however, as to whether Constantine adopted his mother's Christianity in his youth, or whether he adopted it gradually over the course of his life.

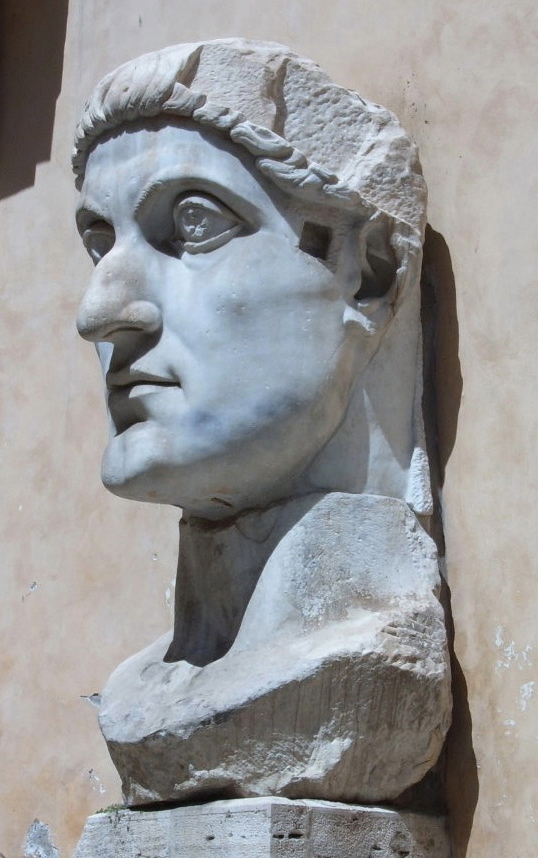
Head of Constantine's colossal statue at Musei Capitolini

In 313, he and Licinius issued the Edict of Milan, officially legalizing Christian worship. In 316, he acted as a judge in a North African dispute concerning the Donatist controversy. More significantly, in 325 he summoned the Council of Nicaea, effectively the first Ecumenical Council (unless the Council of Jerusalem is so classified), to deal mostly with the Arian controversy, but which also issued the Nicene Creed, which among other things professed a belief in One Holy Catholic Apostolic Church, the start of Christendom.

The reign of Constantine established a precedent for the position of the Christian Emperor in the Church. Emperors considered themselves responsible to God for the spiritual health of their subjects, and thus they had a duty to maintain orthodoxy. The emperor did not decide doctrine — that was the responsibility of the bishops — rather his role was to enforce doctrine, root out heresy, and uphold ecclesiastical unity. The emperor ensured that God was properly worshiped in his empire; what proper worship consisted of was the responsibility of the church. This precedent would continue until certain emperors of the fifth and six centuries sought to alter doctrine by imperial edict without recourse to councils, though even after this Constantine's precedent generally remained the norm.

The reign of Constantine did not bring the total unity of Christianity within the Empire. His successor in the East, Constantius II, was an Arian who kept Arian bishops at his court and installed them in various sees, expelling the orthodox bishops.

Constantius's successor, Julian, known in the Christian world as Julian the Apostate, was a philosopher who upon becoming emperor renounced Christianity and embraced a Neo-platonic and mystical form of paganism shocking the Christian establishment. Intent on re-establishing the prestige of the old pagan beliefs, he modified them to resemble Christian traditions such as the episcopal structure and public charity (hitherto unknown in Roman paganism). Julian eliminated most of the privileges and prestige previously afforded to the Christian Church. His reforms attempted to create a form of religious heterogeneity by, among other things, reopening pagan temples, accepting Christian bishops previously exiled as heretics, promoting Judaism, and returning Church lands to their original owners. However, Julian's short reign ended when he died while campaigning in the East. Christianity came to dominance during the reign of Julian's successors, Jovian, Valentinian I, and Valens (the last Eastern Arian Christian Emperor).

However, although state persecution ended, by the early fifth century there was still much remaining prejudice within the empire against Christians: a popular proverb at the time was, according to Augustine of Hippo, "No rain! It's all the fault of the Christians."

== State religion of Rome ==
On February 27, 380, the Roman Empire officially adopted Trinitarian Nicene Christianity as its state religion. Prior to this date, Constantius II (337–361) and Valens (364–378) had personally favored Arian or Semi-Arianism forms of Christianity, but Valens' successor Theodosius I supported the Trinitarian doctrine as expounded in the Nicene Creed.

On this date, Theodosius I decreed that only the followers of Trinitarian Christianity were entitled to be referred to as Catholic Christians, while all others were to be considered to be practicers of heresy, which was to be considered illegal. In 385, this new legal authority of the Church resulted in the first case of many to come, of the capital punishment of a heretic, namely Priscillian.

In the several centuries of state sponsored Christianity that followed, pagans and heretical Christians were routinely persecuted by the Empire and the many kingdoms and countries that later occupied the place of the Empire, but some Germanic tribes remained Arian well into the Middle Ages.

== Theology and heresy ==
=== Heresies ===
The earliest controversies were generally Christological in nature; that is, they were related to Jesus' (eternal) divinity or humanity. Docetism held that Jesus' humanity was merely an illusion, thus denying the incarnation. Arianism held that Jesus, while not merely mortal, was not eternally divine and was, therefore, of lesser status than God the Father (John 14:28). Modalism (also called Sabellianism or Patripassianism) is the belief that the Father, Son, and Holy Spirit are three different modes or aspects of God, as opposed to the Trinitarian view of three distinct persons or hypostases within the Godhead. A number of groups held dualistic beliefs, maintaining that reality was composed into two radically opposing parts: matter, usually seen as evil, and spirit, seen as good. Others held that both the material and spiritual worlds were created by God and were therefore both good, and that this was represented in the unified divine and human natures of Christ.

The development of doctrine, the position of orthodoxy, and the relationship between the various opinions is a matter of continuing academic debate. Since most Christians today subscribe to the doctrines established by the Nicene Creed, modern Christian theologians tend to regard the early debates as a unified orthodox position (see also Proto-orthodox Christianity and Palaeo-orthodoxy) against a minority of heretics. Other scholars, drawing upon, among other things, distinctions between Jewish Christians, Pauline Christians, and other groups such as Gnostics and Marcionites, argue that early Christianity was fragmented, with contemporaneous competing orthodoxies.

=== Nicene and Post-Nicene Fathers ===
Later Church Fathers wrote volumes of theological texts, including Augustine, Gregory Nazianzus, Cyril of Jerusalem, Ambrose of Milan, Jerome, and others. What resulted was a golden age of literary and scholarly activity unmatched since the days of Virgil and Horace. Some of these fathers, such as John Chrysostom and Athanasius, suffered exile, persecution, or martyrdom from Arian Byzantine Emperors. A number of their writings are translated into English in the compilations of Nicene and Post-Nicene Fathers.

=== Ecumenical councils ===
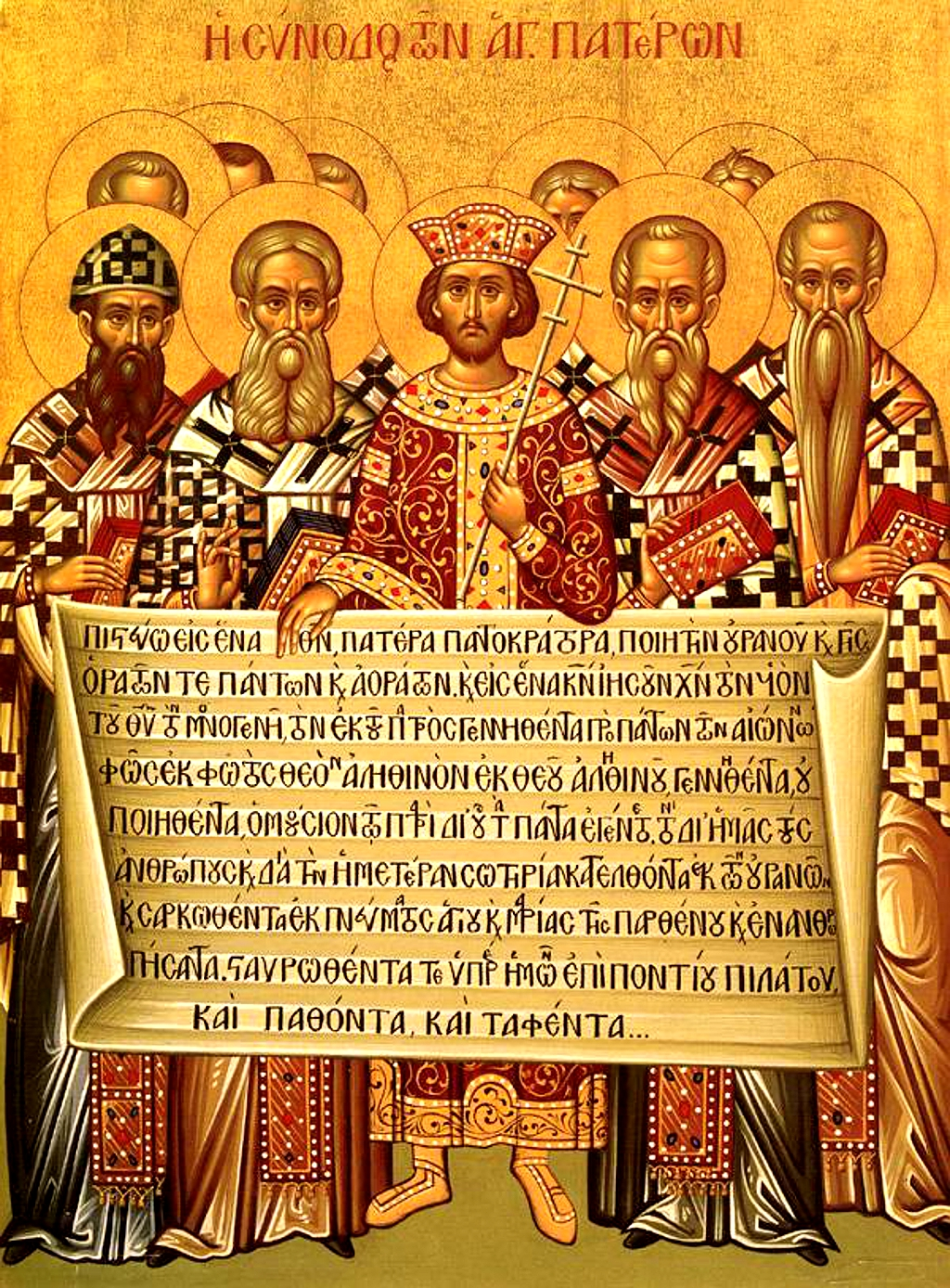
Icon depicting the Emperor Constantine (center) and the bishops of the First Council of Nicaea (325) holding the Niceno–Constantinopolitan Creed of 381.

During this era, several Ecumenical Councils were convened.

- First Council of Nicaea (325)
- First Council of Constantinople (381)
- First Council of Ephesus (431)
- Council of Chalcedon (451)

These were mostly concerned with Christological disputes and represent an attempt to reach an orthodox consensus and to establish a unified Christian theology. The Council of Nicaea (325) condemned Arian teachings as heresy and produced a creed (see Nicene Creed). The Council of Ephesus condemned Nestorianism and affirmed the Blessed Virgin Mary to be Theotokos ("God-bearer" or "Mother of God"). The Council of Chalcedon asserted that Christ had two natures, fully God and fully man, distinct yet always in perfect union, largely affirming Leo's "Tome." It overturned the result of the Second Council of Ephesus, condemned Monophysitism and influenced later condemnations of Monothelitism. None of the councils were universally accepted, and each major doctrinal decision resulted in a schism. The First Council of Ephesus caused the Nestorian schism in 431 and separated the Church of the East, and the Council of Chalcedon caused the Chalcedonian Schism in 451, which separated Oriental Orthodoxy.

==== Council of Nicaea (325) ====
Emperor Constantine convened this council to settle a controversial issue, the relation between Jesus Christ and God the Father. The Emperor wanted to establish universal agreement on it. Representatives came from across the Empire, subsidized by the Emperor. Previous to this council, the bishops would hold local councils, such as the Council of Jerusalem, but there had been no universal, or ecumenical, council.

The council drew up a creed, the original Nicene Creed, which received nearly unanimous support. The council's description of "God's only-begotten Son", Jesus Christ, as of the same substance with God the Father became a touchstone of Christian Trinitarianism. The council also addressed the issue of dating Easter (see Quartodecimanism and Easter controversy), recognised the right of the see of Alexandria to jurisdiction outside of its own province (by analogy with the jurisdiction exercised by Rome) and the prerogatives of the churches in Antioch and the other provinces and approved the custom by which Jerusalem was honoured, but without the metropolitan dignity.

The council was opposed by the Arians, and Constantine tried to reconcile Arius, after whom Arianism is named, with the Church. Even when Arius died in 336, one year before the death of Constantine, the controversy continued, with various separate groups espousing Arian sympathies in one way or another. In 359, a double council of Eastern and Western bishops affirmed a formula stating that the Father and the Son were similar in accord with the scriptures, the crowning victory for Arianism. The opponents of Arianism rallied, but in the First Council of Constantinople in 381 marked the final victory of Nicene orthodoxy within the Empire, though Arianism had by then spread to the Germanic tribes, among whom it gradually disappeared after the conversion of the Franks to Catholicism in 496.

==== Council of Constantinople (381) ====
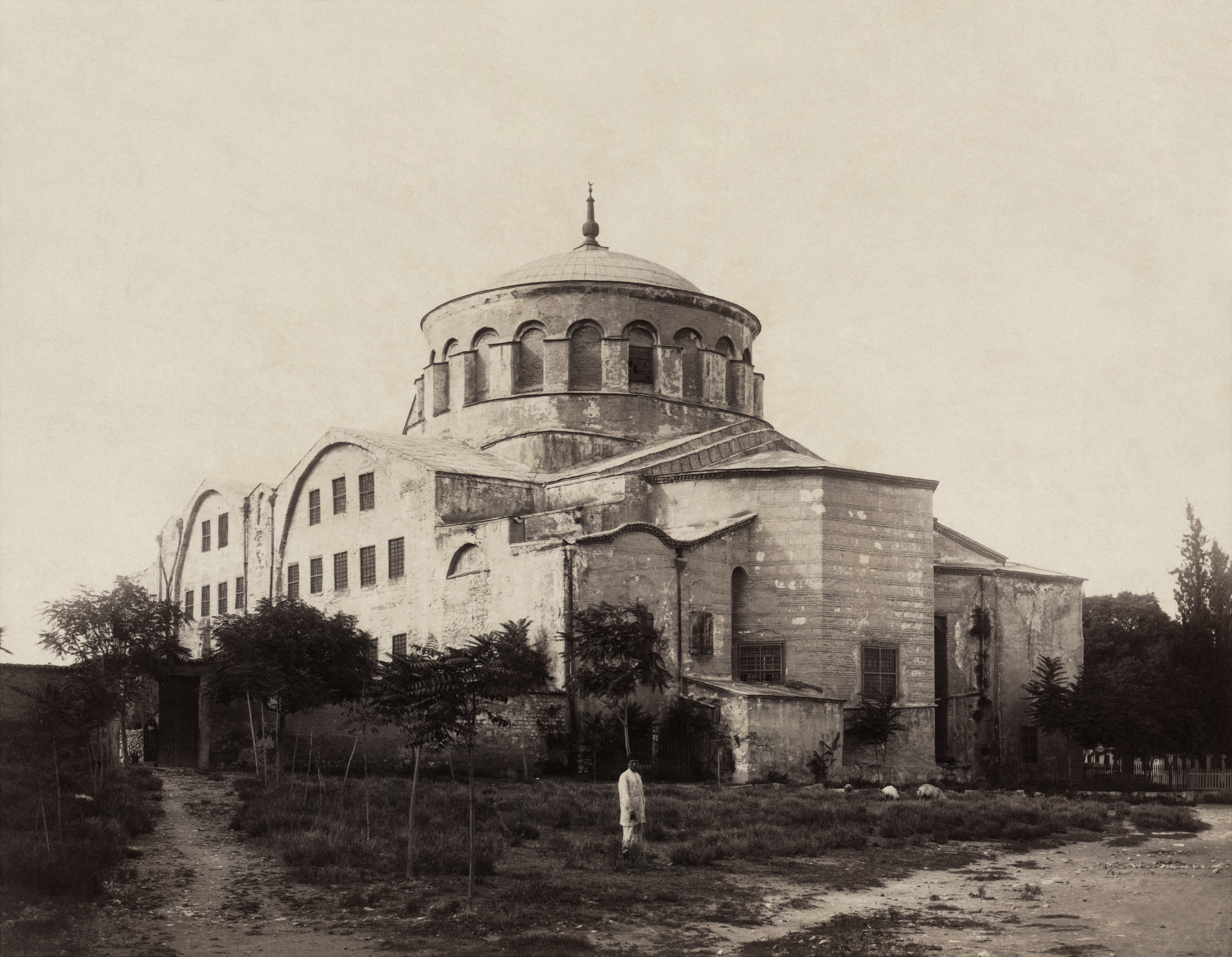
Hagia Irene is a former church, now a museum, in Istanbul. Commissioned in the 4th century, it ranks as the first church built in Constantinople, and has its original atrium. In 381 the First Council of Constantinople took place in the church. Damaged by an earthquake in the 8th century, its present form largely dates from repairs made at that time.

The council approved the current form of the Nicene Creed as used in the Eastern Orthodox Church and Oriental Orthodox Churches, but, except when Greek is used, with two additional Latin phrases ("Deum de Deo" and "Filioque") in the West. The form used by the Armenian Apostolic Church, which is part of Oriental Orthodoxy, has multiple more additions. This fuller creed may have existed before the council and probably originated from the baptismal creed of Constantinople.

The council also condemned Apollinarism, the teaching that there was no human mind or soul in Christ. It also granted Constantinople honorary precedence over all churches save Rome.

The council did not include Western bishops or Roman legates, but it was accepted as ecumenical in the West.

==== Council of Ephesus (431) ====
Theodosius II called the council to settle the Nestorian controversy. Nestorius, Patriarch of Constantinople, opposed use of the term Theotokos (Greek Η Θεοτόκος, "God-bearer"). This term had long been used by orthodox writers, and it was gaining popularity along with devotion to Mary as Mother of God. He reportedly taught that there were two separate persons in the incarnate Christ, though whether he actually taught this is disputed.

The council deposed Nestorius, repudiated Nestorianism as heretical, and proclaimed the Virgin Mary as the Theotokos. After quoting the Nicene Creed in its original form, as at the First Council of Nicaea, without the alterations and additions made at the First Council of Constantinople, it declared it "unlawful for any man to bring forward, or to write, or to compose a different (ἑτέραν) Faith as a rival to that established by the holy Fathers assembled with the Holy Ghost in Nicæa."

The result of the Council led to political upheaval in the church, as the Assyrian Church of the East and the Persian Sasanian Empire supported Nestorius, resulting in the Nestorian schism, which separated the Church of the East from the Latin Byzantine Church.

==== Council of Chalcedon (451) ====
Spectrum of Christological beliefs in late antiquity

The council repudiated the Eutychian doctrine of Monophysitism, described and delineated the "Hypostatic Union" and two natures of Christ, human and divine; adopted the Chalcedonian Creed. For those who accept it, it is the Fourth Ecumenical Council. It rejected the decision of the Second Council of Ephesus, referred to by the pope at the time as the "Robber Council".

The Council of Chalcedon resulted in a schism, with the Oriental Orthodox Churches breaking communion with Chalcedonian Christianity.

== Biblical canon ==
The Biblical canon—is the set of books Christians regard as divinely inspired and thus constituting the Christian Bible-- developed over time. While there was a good measure of debate in the Early Church over the New Testament canon, the major writings were accepted by almost all Christians by the middle of the 2nd century.

=== Constantine commissions Bibles ===
In 331, Constantine I commissioned Eusebius to deliver "Fifty Bibles" for the Church of Constantinople. Athanasius (Apol. Const. 4) recorded Alexandrian scribes around 340 preparing Bibles for Constans. Little else is known, though there is plenty of speculation. For example, it is speculated that this may have provided motivation for canon lists, and that Codex Vaticanus, Sinaiticus and Alexandrinus are examples of these Bibles. Together with the Peshitta, these are the earliest extant Christian Bibles.

=== Current canon ===
In his Easter letter of 367, Athanasius, Bishop of Alexandria, gave a list of exactly the same books as what would become the New Testament canon, and he used the word "canonised" (kanonizomena) in regards to them. The African Synod of Hippo, in 393, approved the New Testament, as it stands today, together with the Septuagint books, a decision that was repeated by the Council of Carthage (397) and the Council of Carthage (419). These councils were under the authority of St. Augustine, who regarded the canon as already closed. Pope Damasus I's Council of Rome in 382, if the Decretum Gelasianum is correctly associated with it, issued a biblical canon identical to that mentioned above, or if not the list is at least a sixth-century compilation. Likewise, Damasus's commissioning of the Latin Vulgate edition of the Bible, c. 383, was instrumental in the fixation of the canon in the West. In 405, Pope Innocent I sent a list of the sacred books to a Gallic bishop, Exsuperius of Toulouse. When these bishops and councils spoke on the matter, however, they were not defining something new, but instead "were ratifying what had already become the mind of the Church." Thus, from the 4th century, there existed unanimity in the West concerning the New Testament canon (as it is today), and by the fifth century the East, with a few exceptions, had come to accept the Book of Revelation and thus had come into harmony on the matter of the canon.

Nonetheless, a full dogmatic articulation of the canon was not made until the 16th century and 17th century.

== Church structure within the Empire ==
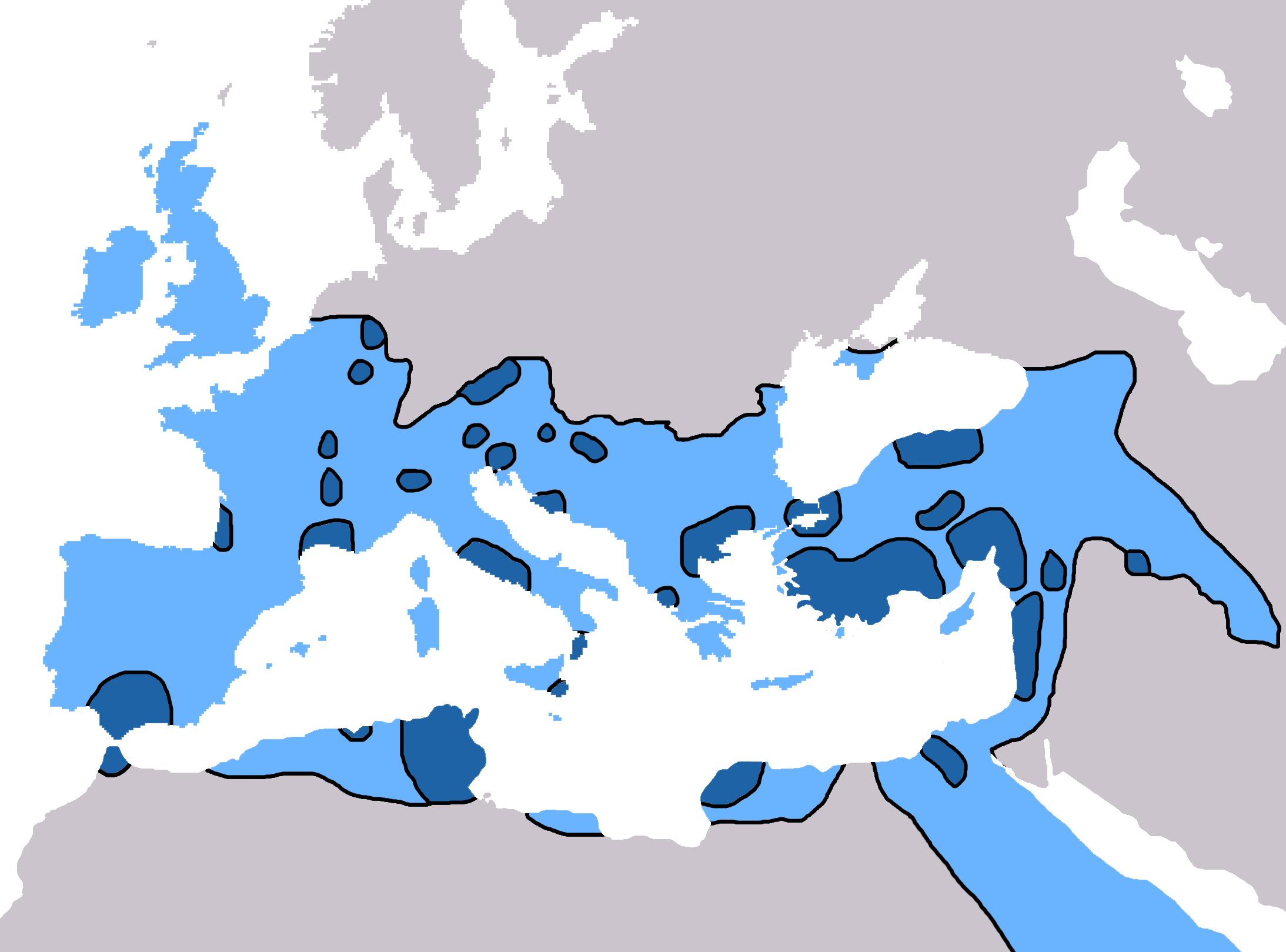
Spread of Christianity to AD 325 Spread of Christianity to AD 600

=== Dioceses ===
After legalisation, the Church adopted the same organisational boundaries as the Empire: geographical provinces, called dioceses, corresponding to imperial governmental territorial division. The bishops, who were located in major urban centers by pre-legalisation tradition, thus oversaw each diocese. The bishop's location was his "seat", or "see"; among the sees, five held special eminence: Rome, Constantinople, Jerusalem, Antioch, and Alexandria. The prestige of these sees depended in part on their apostolic founders, from whom the bishops were therefore the spiritual successors, e.g., St. Mark as founder of the See of Alexandria, St. Peter of the See of Rome, etc. There were other significant elements: Jerusalem was the location of Christ's death and resurrection, the site of a 1st-century council, etc., see also Jerusalem in Christianity. Antioch was where Jesus' followers were first labelled as Christians, it was used in a derogatory way to berate the followers of Jesus the Christ. Rome was where SS. Peter and Paul had been martyred (killed), Constantinople was the "New Rome" where Constantine had moved his capital c. 330, and, lastly, all these cities had important relics.

=== The Pentarchy ===
By the 5th century, the ecclesiastical had evolved a hierarchical "pentarchy" or system of five sees (patriarchates), with a settled order of precedence, had been established. Rome, as the ancient capital and once largest city of the empire, was understandably given certain primacy within the pentarchy into which Christendom was now divided; though it was and still held that the patriarch of Rome was the first among equals. Constantinople was considered second in precedence as the new capital of the empire.

Among these dioceses, the five with special eminence were Rome, Constantinople, Jerusalem, Antioch, and Alexandria. The prestige of most of these sees depended in part on their apostolic founders, from whom the bishops were therefore the spiritual successors. Though the patriarch of Rome was still held to be the first among equals, Constantinople was second in precedence as the new capital of the empire.

=== Papacy and Primacy ===
The Bishop of Rome has the title of Pope and the office is the "papacy." As a bishopric, its origin is consistent with the development of an episcopal structure in the 1st century. The papacy, however, also carries the notion of primacy: that the See of Rome is pre-eminent among all other sees. The origins of this concept are historically obscure; theologically, it is based on three ancient Christian traditions: (1) that the apostle Peter was pre-eminent among the apostles, see Primacy of Simon Peter, (2) that Peter ordained his successors for the Roman See, and (3) that the bishops are the successors of the apostles (apostolic succession). As long as the Papal See also happened to be the capital of the Western Empire, the prestige of the Bishop of Rome could be taken for granted without the need of sophisticated theological argumentation beyond these points; after its shift to Milan and then Ravenna, however, more detailed arguments were developed based on Matthew 16:18–19 etc. Nonetheless, in antiquity the Petrine and Apostolic quality, as well as a "primacy of respect", concerning the Roman See went unchallenged by emperors, eastern patriarchs, and the Eastern Church alike. The Ecumenical Council of Constantinople in 381 affirmed the primacy of Rome. Though the appellate jurisdiction of the Pope, and the position of Constantinople, would require further doctrinal clarification, by the close of Antiquity the primacy of Rome and the sophisticated theological arguments supporting it were fully developed. Just what exactly was entailed in this primacy, and its being exercised, would become a matter of controversy at certain later times.

== Outside the Roman Empire ==
Christianity was by no means confined to the Roman Empire during late antiquity.

=== Church of the East ===
Historically, the most widespread Christian church in Asia was the Church of the East, the Christian church of Sasanian Persia. This church is often known as the Nestorian Church, due to its adoption of the doctrine of Nestorianism, which emphasized the disunity of the divine and human natures of Christ. It has also been known as the Persia Church, the East Syrian Church, the Assyrian Church, and, in China, as the "Luminous Religion".

The Church of the East developed almost wholly apart from the Greek and Roman churches. In the 5th century it endorsed the doctrine of Nestorius, Patriarch of Constantinople from 428 to 431, especially following the Nestorian Schism after the condemnation of Nestorius for heresy at the First Council of Ephesus. For at least twelve hundred years the Church of the East was noted for its missionary zeal, its high degree of lay participation, its superior educational standards and cultural contributions in less developed countries, and its fortitude in the face of persecution.

==== Persian Empires ====
The Church of the East had its inception at a very early date in the buffer zone between the Roman Empire and the Parthian in Upper Mesopotamia. Edessa (now Şanlıurfa) in northwestern Mesopotamia was from apostolic times the principal center of Syriac-speaking Christianity. The missionary movement in the East began which gradually spread throughout Mesopotamia and Persia and by AD 280. When Constantine converted to Christianity the Persian Empire, suspecting a new "enemy within", became violently anti-Christian. The great persecution fell upon the Christians in Persia about the year 340. Though the religious motives were never unrelated, the primary cause of the persecution was political. Sometime before the death of Shapur II in 379, the intensity of the persecution slackened. Tradition calls it a forty-year persecution, lasting from 339 to 379 and ending only with Shapur's death.

=== Caucasus ===
Christianity became the official religion of Armenia in 301 or 314, when Christianity was still illegal in the Roman Empire. Some claim the Armenian Apostolic Church was founded by Gregory the Illuminator of the late third – early fourth centuries while they trace their origins to the missions of Bartholomew the Apostle and Thaddeus (Jude the Apostle) in the 1st century.

Christianity in Georgia (ancient Iberia) extends back to the 4th century, if not earlier. The Iberian king, Mirian III, converted to Christianity, probably in 326.

=== Ethiopia ===
According to the fourth-century Western historian Rufinius, it was Frumentius who brought Christianity to Ethiopia (the city of Axum) and served as its first bishop, probably shortly after 325.

=== Germanic peoples ===
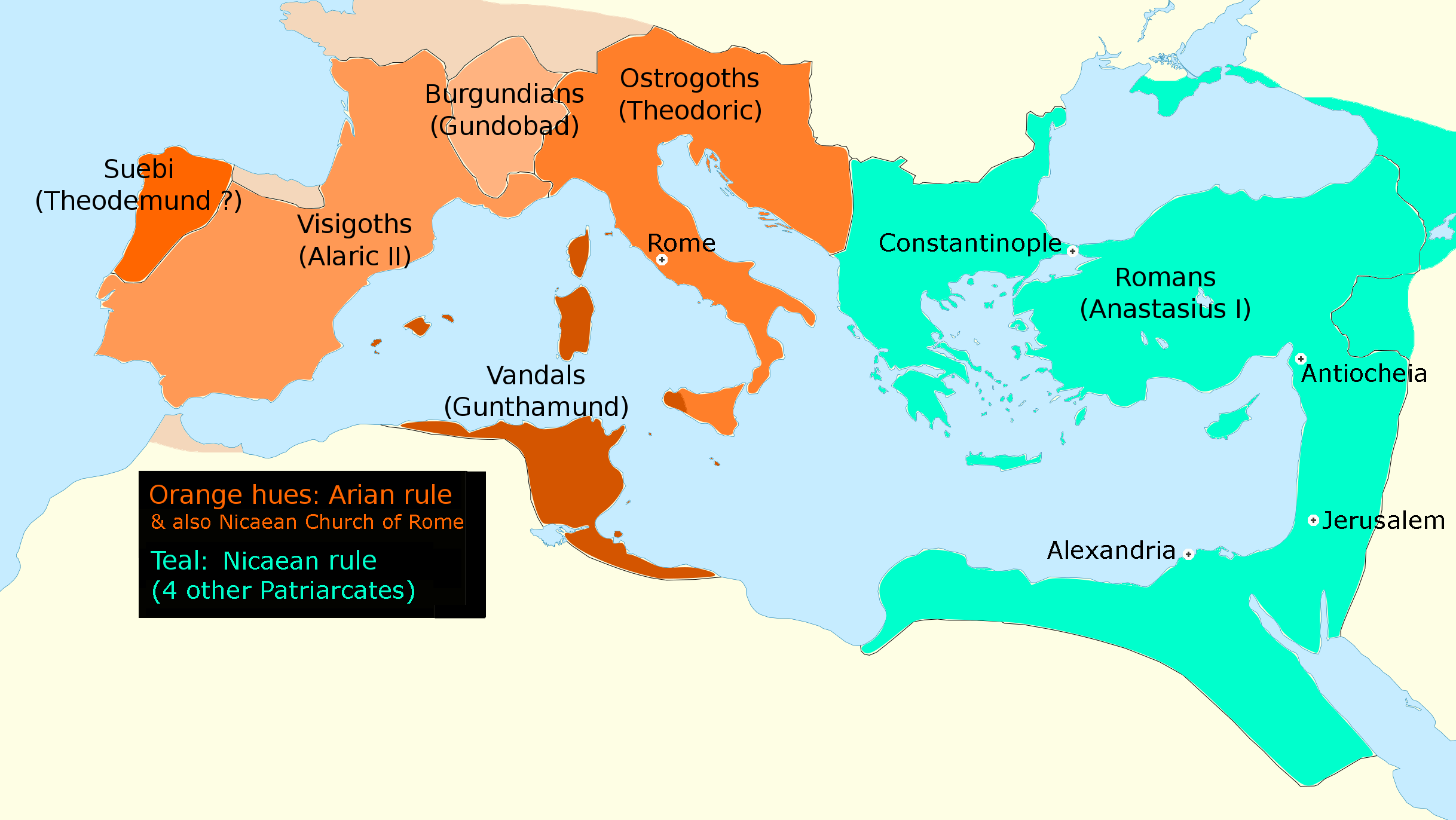
Christian states in 495 AD

The Germanic people underwent gradual Christianization from Late Antiquity. In the 4th century, the early process of Christianization of the various Germanic people was partly facilitated by the prestige of the Christian Roman Empire amongst European pagans. Until the decline of the Roman Empire, the Germanic tribes who had migrated there (with the exceptions of the Saxons, Franks, and Lombards, see below) had converted to Christianity. Some of them, notably the Goths and Vandals, adopted Arianism instead of the Trinitarian (a.k.a. Nicene or orthodox) beliefs that were dogmatically defined by the Church Fathers in the Nicene Creed and Council of Chalcedon. The gradual rise of Germanic Christianity was, at times, voluntary, particularly amongst groups associated with the Roman Empire.

From the 6th century AD, Germanic tribes were converted (and re-converted) by missionaries of the Catholic Church.

Many Goths converted to Christianity as individuals outside the Roman Empire. Most members of other tribes converted to Christianity when their respective tribes settled within the Empire, and most Franks and Anglo-Saxons converted a few generations later. During the later centuries following the Fall of Rome, as schism between the dioceses loyal to the Pope of Rome in the West and those loyal to the other Patriarchs in the East, most of the Germanic peoples (excepting the Crimean Goths and a few other eastern groups) would gradually become strongly allied with the Catholic Church in the West, particularly as a result of the reign of Charlemagne.

==== Goths ====
In the 3rd century, East-Germanic peoples migrated into Scythia. Gothic culture and identity emerged from various East-Germanic, local, and Roman influences. In the same period, Gothic raiders took captives among the Romans, including a number of Christians, (and Roman-supported raiders took captives among the Goths).

Wulfila or Ulfilas was the son or grandson of Christian captives from Sadagolthina in Cappadocia. In 337 or 341, Wulfila became the first bishop of the (Christian) Goths. By 348, one of the (Pagan) Gothic kings (reikos) began persecuting the Christian Goths, and Wulfila and other Christian Goths fled to Moesia Secunda (in modern Bulgaria) in the Roman Empire. Other Christians, including Wereka, Batwin, and Saba, died in later persecutions.

Between 348 and 383, Wulfila translated the Bible into the Gothic language. Thus some Arian Christians in the west used the vernacular languages, in this case including Gothic and Latin, for services, as did Christians in the eastern Roman provinces, while most Christians in the western provinces used Latin.

==== Franks and Alemanni ====
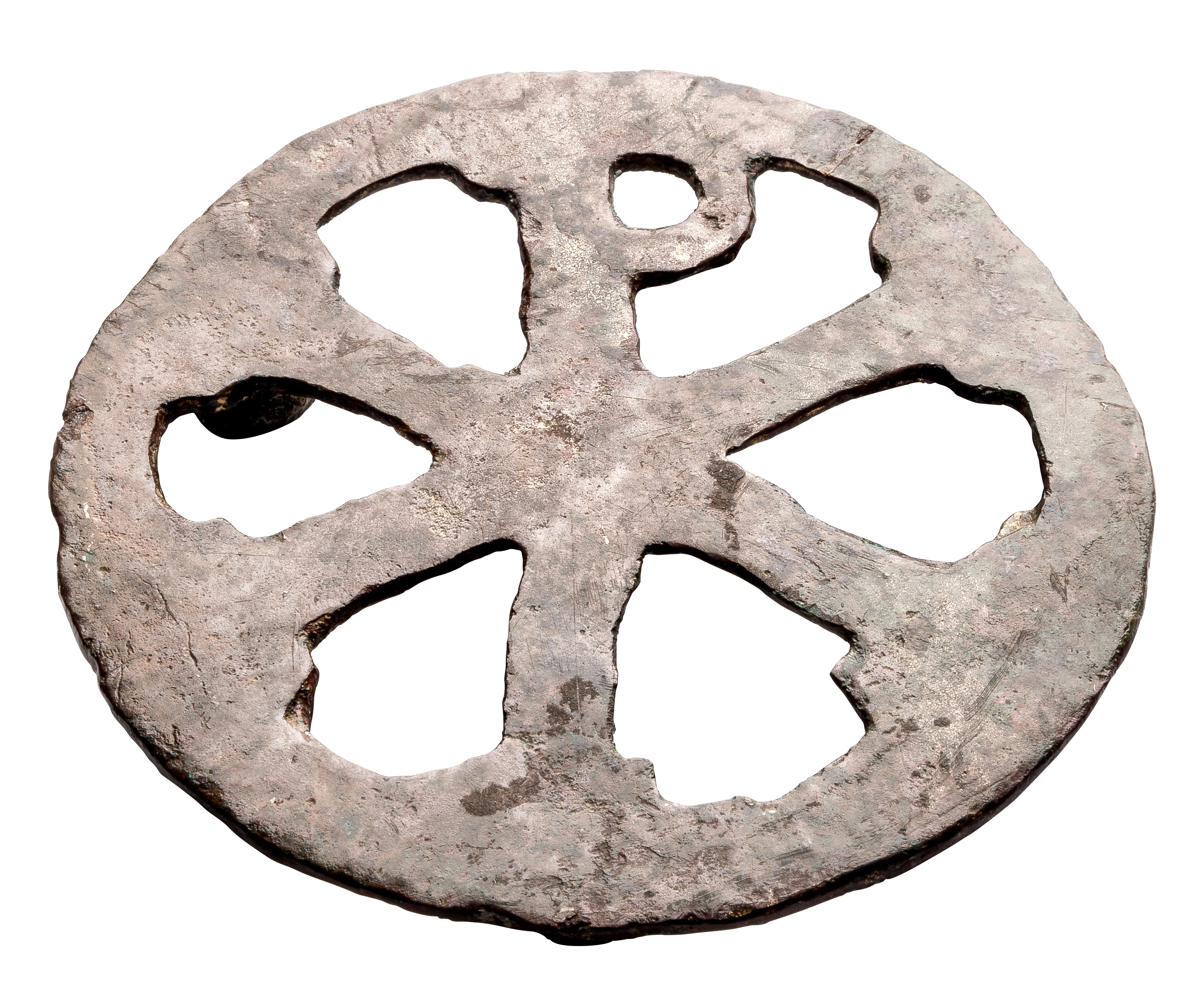
Roman Chi Rho applique in bronze found in a Germanic settlement in Neerharen (Belgium), 375-450 CE, Gallo-Roman Museum (Tongeren)

The Franks and their ruling Merovingian dynasty, that had migrated to Gaul from the 3rd century had remained pagan at first. On Christmas 496, however, Clovis I following his victory at the Battle of Tolbiac converted to the orthodox faith of the Catholic Church and let himself be baptised at Rheims. The details of this event have been passed down by Gregory of Tours.

== Monasticism ==
Monasticism is a form of asceticism whereby one renounces worldly pursuits (in contempu mundi) and concentrates solely on heavenly and spiritual pursuits, especially by the virtues humility, poverty, and chastity. It began early in the Church as a family of similar traditions, modeled upon Scriptural examples and ideals, and with roots in certain strands of Judaism. St. John the Baptist is seen as the archetypical monk, and monasticism was also inspired by the organisation of the Apostolic community as recorded in Acts of the Apostles.

There are two forms of monasticism: eremitic and cenobitic. Eremitic monks, or hermits, live in solitude, whereas cenobitic monks live in communities, generally in a monastery, under a rule (or code of practice) and are governed by an abbot. Originally, all Christian monks were hermits, following the example of Anthony the Great. However, the need for some form of organised spiritual guidance lead Saint Pachomius in 318 to organise his followers in what was to become the first monastery. Soon, similar institutions were established throughout the Egyptian desert as well as the rest of the eastern half of the Roman Empire. Central figures in the development of monasticism were, in the East, St. Basil the Great, and St. Benedict in the West, who created the famous Benedictine Rule, which would become the most common rule throughout the Middle Ages.

== See also ==
- Ante-Nicene Period
- Church Fathers
- Christian monasticism
- Christianization
- Development of the New Testament canon
- Historiography of the Christianization of the Roman Empire
- History of Calvinist-Arminian debate
- History of Christianity
- History of Christian theology
- History of Oriental Orthodoxy
- History of the Eastern Orthodox Church
- History of the Roman Catholic Church
- List of Church Fathers
- Patristics
- State church of the Roman Empire
- Timeline of Christian missions
- Timeline of Christianity

== Print resources ==
- Guericke, Heinrich Ernst; et al. (1857). A Manual of Church History: Ancient Church History Comprising the First Six Centuries. New York: Wiley and Halsted.
- González, Justo L. (1984). The Story of Christianity: Vol. 1: The Early Church to the Reformation. San Francisco: Harper. ISBN 0-06-063315-8.
- Latourette, Kenneth Scott (1975). A History of Christianity, Volume 1: Beginnings to 1500 (Revised) (paperback). San Francisco: Harper. ISBN 0-06-064952-6.
- Shelley, Bruce L. (1996). Church History in Plain Language (2nd ed.). Word Pub. ISBN 0-8499-3861-9.
- Hastings, Adrian (1999). A World History of Christianity. Wm. B. Eerdmans Publishing. ISBN 0-8028-4875-3.

History of Christianity: Late ancient Christianity
Preceded by: Ante-Nicene; Period / Late ancient Christianity / Followed by: The Middle; Ages
BC	C1	C2	C3	C4	C5	C6	C7	C8	C9	C10
C11	C12	C13	C14	C15	C16	C17	C18	C19	C20	C21
