= Edict of Thessalonica =

Edict establishing Christianity as the Roman Empire's state religion, issued in AD 380

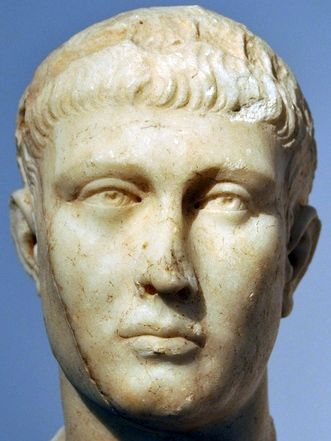
A bust of Theodosius I

The Edict of Thessalonica (Greek: Διάταγμα της Θεσσαλονίκης), issued on 27 February AD 380 by Theodosius I, made Nicene Christianity (Note: The Edict is the first which definitely introduces catholic orthodoxy as the established religion of the Roman State. It marks the end of the fourth-century religious controversy on the Trinity, occasioned by Arianism and calling forth definitions of orthodox dogma by the First Council of Nicaea (325) and the First Council of Constantinople (381). Acknowledgment of the true doctrine of the Trinity is made the test of State recognition. The citation of the Roman See as the yardstick of correct belief is significant; bracketing of the name of the Patriarch of Alexandria with that of the Pope was due to the Egyptian See's stalwart defence of the Trinitarian position, particularly under Athanasius of Alexandria. The last sentence of the Edict indicates that the Emperors contemplate the use of physical force in the service of orthodoxy; this is the first recorded instance of such a departure.) the state church of the Roman Empire. It condemned other Christian creeds such as Arianism as heresies of "foolish madmen", and authorized their punishment.

This edict, addressed to the inhabitants of Constantinople whom Theodosius wished to pacify in order to make the city his imperial residence, constitutes the first known secular law which includes in its preamble a clear definition of what a Christian Roman ruler considers as religious orthodoxy, opening the way of repression against dissidents qualified as "heretics". The Edict of Thessalonica was subsequently incorporated into Book XVI of the Theodosian Code and was the milestone of the official Christianization of the Roman Empire.

== Background ==
In 313 the emperor Constantine I, together with his eastern counterpart Licinius, issued the Edict of Milan, which granted religious toleration and freedom for persecuted Christians. By 325 Arianism, a school of christology which contended that Christ did not possess the divine essence of the Father but was rather a primordial creation and an entity subordinate to God, had become sufficiently widespread and controversial in Early Christianity that Constantine called the Council of Nicaea in an attempt to end the controversy by establishing an empire-wide, i.e., "ecumenical" orthodoxy. The council produced the original text of the Nicene Creed, which rejected the Arian confession and upheld that Christ is "true God" and "of one essence with the Father."

However, the strife within the Church did not end with Nicaea, and the Nicene credal formulation remained contentious even among anti-Arian churchmen. Constantine, while urging tolerance, began to think that he had come down on the wrong side, and that the Nicenes—with their fervid, reciprocal persecution of Arians—were actually perpetuating strife within the Church. Constantine was not baptized until he was near death (337), choosing a bishop moderately sympathetic to Arius, Eusebius of Nicomedia, to perform the baptism.

Constantius II, Constantine's son and successor in the eastern empire, was partial to the Arian party, and even exiled pro-Nicene bishops. Constantius' successor Julian (later called "The Apostate" by Christian writers) was the only emperor after the conversion of Constantine to reject Christianity, attempting to fragment the Church and erode its influence by encouraging a revival of religious diversity, calling himself a "Hellene" and supporting forms of Hellenistic religion. He championed the traditional religious cultus of Rome as well as Judaism, and furthermore declared toleration for all the various unorthodox Christian sects and schismatic movements. Julian's successor Jovian, a Christian, reigned for only eight months and never entered the city of Constantinople. He was succeeded in the east by Valens, an Arian.

By 379, when Valens was succeeded by Theodosius I, Arianism was widespread in the eastern half of the Empire, while the west had remained steadfastly Nicene. Theodosius, who had been born in Hispania, was himself a Nicene Christian and very devout. In August, his western counterpart Gratian promoted persecution of heretics in the west.

== Content ==
The Edict of Thessalonica was jointly issued by Theodosius I, emperor of the East, Gratian, emperor of the West, and Gratian's junior co-ruler Valentinian II, on 27 February 380. The edict came after Theodosius had been baptized by the bishop Ascholius of Thessalonica upon suffering a severe illness in that city.

IMPPP. GR(ATI)ANUS, VAL(ENTINI)ANUS ET THE(O)D(OSIUS) AAA. EDICTUM AD POPULUM VRB(IS) CONSTANTINOP(OLITANAE).

Cunctos populos, quos clementiae nostrae regit temperamentum, in tali volumus religione versari, quam divinum Petrum apostolum tradidisse Romanis religio usque ad nunc ab ipso insinuata declarat quamque pontificem Damasum sequi claret et Petrum Aleksandriae episcopum virum apostolicae sanctitatis, hoc est, ut secundum apostolicam disciplinam evangelicamque doctrinam patris et filii et spiritus sancti unam deitatem sub pari maiestate et sub pia trinitate credamus. … Hanc legem sequentes Christianorum catholicorum nomen iubemus amplecti, reliquos vero dementes vesanosque iudicantes haeretici dogmatis infamiam sustinere ‘nec conciliabula eorum ecclesiarum nomen accipere’, divina primum vindicta, post etiam motus nostri, quem ex caelesti arbitro sumpserimus, ultione plectendos.

DAT. III Kal. Mar. THESSAL(ONICAE) GR(ATI)ANO A. V ET THEOD(OSIO) A. I CONSS.

EMPERORS GRATIAN, VALENTINIAN AND THEODOSIUS AUGUSTI. EDICT TO THE PEOPLE OF CONSTANTINOPLE.
It is our desire that all the various nations which are subject to our Clemency and Moderation, should continue to profess that religion which was delivered to the Romans by the divine Apostle Peter, as it has been preserved by faithful tradition, and which is now professed by the Pontiff Damasus and by Peter, Bishop of Alexandria, a man of apostolic holiness. According to the apostolic teaching and the doctrine of the Gospel, let us believe in the one deity of the Father and of the Son and of the Holy Spirit, in equal majesty and in a holy Trinity. … We order the followers of this law to embrace the name of Catholic Christians; but as for the others, since, in our judgment they are foolish madmen, we decree that they shall be branded with the ignominious name of heretics, and shall not presume to give to their conventicles the name of churches. They will suffer in the first place the chastisement of the divine condemnation and in the second the punishment of our authority which in accordance with the will of Heaven we shall decide to inflict.
GIVEN IN THESSALONICA ON THE THIRD DAY FROM THE CALENDS OF MARCH, DURING THE FIFTH CONSULATE OF GRATIAN AUGUSTUS AND FIRST OF THEODOSIUS AUGUSTUS

— Codex Theodosianus, xvi.1.2

== Importance ==
The edict was followed in 381 by the First Council of Constantinople, which affirmed the Nicene Symbolum and gave final form to the Nicene-Constantinopolitan Creed.

== See also ==
- Ancient Roman Christianity
- Christianization of the Roman Empire
- History of late ancient Christianity
- Persecution of pagans in the late Roman Empire

== Bibliography ==
- Boyd, William Kenneth (1905). The Ecclesiastical Edicts of the Theodosian Code. Columbia University Press.
- Ehler, Sidney Zdeneck; Morrall, John B (1967). Church and State Through the Centuries: A Collection of Historic Documents with Commentaries. ISBN 978-0-8196-0189-6.
- Ferguson, Everett; McHugh, Michael P.; Norris, Frederick W. (1999). Encyclopedia of Early Christianity. Taylor & Francis. ISBN 0-8153-3319-6.
- Williams, Stephen; Friell, Gerard (1994). Theodosius: The Empire at Bay. B.T. Batsford Ltd. ISBN 0-300-06173-0.
