= Ascholius =

Bishop of Thesssalonica and Eastern christian saint

Saint Ascholius
- Venerated in: Eastern Orthodox Church Roman Catholic Church

Saint Ascholius (Ἀσχόλιος, d. 383/4) was Bishop of Thessalonica from AD 379 until his death, at the time of the adoption of Christianity as the state religion of the Roman Empire. He baptized Emperor Theodosius I. Ascholius was appointed Bishop of Thessalonica by Damasus, Bishop of Rome in an attempt to preserve Roman influence over the area in the face of a policy of expansion pursued by the Bishop of Constantinople. Ascholius was present at the First Council of Constantinople in 381 where the claims of Maximus the Cynic to the bishopric of Constantinople were rejected.
