= Maximus I of Constantinople =

Archbishop of Constantinople from 380

- Archbishop of Constantinople
- Installed: c. January 380
- Term ended: May 380
- Predecessor: Evagrius of Constantinople
- Successor: Gregory of Nazianzus

Personal details
- Born: Alexandria
- Died: 380
- Denomination: Orthodox

Maximus I of Constantinople, also known as Maximus the Cynic (Greek: Μάξιμος ὁ Κυνικός), was the intrusive archbishop of Constantinople in 380, where he became a rival of Gregory of Nazianzus.

== Biography ==
Born in Alexandria into a poor family, Maximus was the son of Christian parents, who had suffered on account of their religion; but whether from Pagan or Arian violence is not clear. Maximus united the faith of an orthodox believer with the garb and deportment of a Cynic philosopher. He was initially held in great respect by the leading theologians of the orthodox party. Athanasius of Alexandria, in a letter written about 371, pays him several compliments on a work written in defence of the orthodox faith.

In 374, during the reign of the Roman emperor Valens, in the persecution carried on by Lucius of Alexandria, Arian patriarch of Alexandria, Maximus was flogged, and banished to the Oasis, on account of his zeal for orthodoxy and the aid he offered to those who suffered in the same cause. He obtained his release in about four years, probably on the death of Valens; and sometime after his release he presented to the Roman emperor Gratian at Milan, his work, Περὶ τῆς πίστεως, De Fide, written against the Arians.

He wrote also against other heretics, but whether in the same work or in another is not clear; and disputed against the pagans. Apparently on his return from Milan he visited Constantinople, where Gregory of Nazianzus had just been appointed to the patriarchate (379). Gregory received him with the highest honour; and delivered a panegyrical oration (Oration 25), in the man's own presence in full church, before the celebration of the Eucharist. He received him at his table and treated him with the greatest confidence and regard. He was, however, grievously disappointed in him. Whether the events which followed were the results solely of the ambition of Maximus, or whether Maximus was himself the tool of others, is not clear. Taking advantage of the sickness of Gregory, and supported by some Egyptian ecclesiastics, sent by Peter II of Alexandria, Patriarch of Alexandria, under whose directions they professed to act, Maximus was ordained, during the night, Patriarch of Constantinople, in the place of Gregory, whose election had not been perfectly canonical. The conspirators chose a night in when Gregory was confined by illness, burst into the cathedral, and commenced the consecration. They had set Maximus on the archiepiscopal throne and had just begun shearing away his long curls when the day dawned. The news quickly spread and everybody rushed to the church. The magistrates appeared with their officers; Maximus and his consecrators were driven from the cathedral, and in the tenement of a flute player the tonsure was completed.

This audacious proceeding excited the greatest indignation among the people, with whom Gregory was popular. Maximus withdrew to Thessalonica to lay his cause before the Roman emperor Theodosius I. He met with a cold reception from the emperor, who committed the matter to Ascholius, the much respected bishop of Thessalonica, charging him to refer it to Pope Damasus I. Two letters from Damasus I asked for special care that a Catholic bishop maybe ordained. Maximus returned to Alexandria and demanded that Peter II should assist him in re-establishing himself at Constantinople. Peter II appealed to the prefect, by whom Maximus I was driven out of Egypt.

As the death of Peter II and the accession of Timothy I of Alexandria are dated to 14 February 380, these events must have occurred in 379. The resignation of Gregory, who was succeeded in the patriarchate of Constantinople by Archi Nectarius of Constantinople, did not benefit Maximus I. When the First Council of Constantinople met in 381, Maximus I's claim to the see of Constantinople was unanimously rejected, the last of its original four canons decreeing "that he neither was nor is a bishop, nor are they who have been ordained by him in any rank of the clergy".

Maximus I appealed from the Eastern to the Western church. In the autumn of 381, a synod held either at Aquileia or at Milan under Ambrose's presidency considered Maximus I's claims. Having only his own representations to guide them, and there being no question that Gregory's translation was uncanonical, while the election of Nectarius was open to grave censure as that of an unbaptized layman, Maximus I also exhibiting letters from Peter II the late venerable patriarch, to confirm his asserted communion with the church of Alexandria, the Italian bishops pronounced in favour of Maximus I and refused to recognize either Gregory or Nectarius. A letter of Ambrose and his brother prelates to Theodosius remonstrates against the acts of Nectarius as no rightful bishop, since the chair of Constantinople belonged to Maximus I, whose restoration they demanded, as well as that a general council of Easterns and Westerns, to settle the disputed episcopate and that of Antioch, should be held at Rome. In 382 a provincial synod held at Rome, having received more accurate information, finally rejected Maximus I's claims.

The invectives of Gregory of Nazianzus against Maximus I were written after their struggle for the patriarchate, and contrast starkly with the praises of his twenty-fifth Oration. The work of Maximus I, De Fide, which is well spoken of by Jerome, is lost.

== Notes and references ==
=== Attribution ===
- Venables cites the following sources:
  - Gregory of Nazianzus Orat. xxii, xxviii; Carm. 1 de Vita sua; Carm. cxlviii;
  - Philippe Labbe, Concilia, ii, 947, 954, 959;
  - Jacques Paul Migne, Patrologia Latina xiii, pp. 366-369; Epp. 5, 5, 6;
  - Sozomenus, H. E.; vii. 9;
  - Theodoret, H. E.; v. 8; cf.;
  - Tillemont, Mèm. eccl., ix, 444–456, 501–503.

Titles of the Great Christian Church
Preceded by Evagrius	Archbishop of Constantinople; 380	Succeeded by Gregory of Nazianzus
