= Nectarius of Constantinople =

Archbishop of Constantinople from 381 to 397

- Archbishop of Constantinople
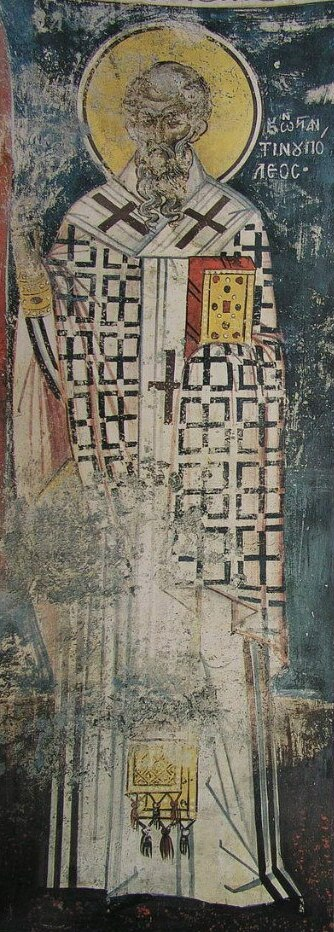
- Church: Christian Church
- Installed: June 381
- Term ended: 27 September 397
- Predecessor: Gregory of Nazianzus
- Successor: John Chrysostom

Personal details
- Born: Tarsus in Cilicia
- Died: 27 September 397

Nectarius of Constantinople (Greek: Νεκτάριος; died 27 September 397) was the archbishop of Constantinople from 381 until his death, the successor to Saint Gregory of Nazianzus and predecessor to John Chrysostom.

== Life ==
Born in Tarsus in Cilicia of a noble family, he was widely known for his admirable character. When Gregory resigned as Archbishop of Constantinople, Nectarius was praetor of Constantinople. Preparing for a journey to Tarsus, he called on the bishop of Tarsus, Diodorus, who was attending the First Council of Constantinople (one of the ecumenical councils), to ask if he could take letters for him; his appearance and manners struck Diodorus so forcibly that he at once determined that he should be advanced as a candidate for Bishop; making an excuse of attending to some other business, he took Nectarius to see Meletius of Antioch.

== His unexpected appointment ==
The Roman emperor Theodosius I asked the Bishops at the Council to suggest new candidates from whom he could pick the new bishop. The Bishop of Antioch put Nectarius' name at the bottom of his list. After reading the lists, the emperor declared Nectarius to be his choice. This caused some amazement among the Fathers who wanted to know who and what this Nectarius was. He was still only a catechumen. There was much astonishment at the emperor's unexpected choice, but the people of Constantinople were delighted at the news as was the whole council.

Nectarius was duly baptized and his clothes were changed for the robes of a Bishop of the Imperial City and became at once president of the First Council of Constantinople.

Nectarius ruled the church for upwards of 16 years and is thought of as having been a good prelate. His name heads the 150 signatures to the canons of the First Council of Constantinople. Given the personal favor which the emperor bore to Nectarius, the 3rd canon declared that the Bishop of Constantinople shall hold the first rank after the bishop of Rome because Constantinople is the new Rome.

== Dissent threatens ==
The Bishops of the West opposed the election result and asked for a common synod of East and West to settle the succession and so the Emperor Theodosius I, soon after the close of the first council, summoned the Imperial Bishops to a fresh synod at Constantinople; nearly all of the same bishops who had attended the earlier second council were assembled again in early summer of 382. On arrival they received a letter from the synod of Milan, inviting them to a great general council at Rome; however, they indicated that they must remain where they were because they had not made any preparations for such long a journey. However, they sent three (Syriacus, Eusebius and Priscian of Lydia) with a synodal letter to Pope Damasus I, archbishop Saint Ambrose and the other bishops assembled in the council at Rome.

The Roman synod to which this letter was addressed was the fifth under Damasus. No formal account remains of its proceedings, nor of how its members treated the question of Nectarius. Theodosius I, did however, send commissaries to Rome in support of his synod. In his 15th letter (to the bishops of Illyria) he indicated that the church in Rome had finally agreed to recognize both Nectarius of Constantinople and Flavian I of Antioch.

Six letters from Nectarius remain extant in the files of his predecessor Gregory of Nazianzus. In the first he expresses his hearty good wishes for his episcopate. The last is of great importance, urging him not to be too liberal in tolerating the Apollinarians.

In 383 a third synod at Constantinople was held. In spite of the decrees of bishops and emperor, the Arians and Pneumatomachians continued to spread their doctrines. Theodosius summoned all parties to the Imperial city for a great discussion in June, hoping to reconcile all differences. Before this, he had sent for the Archbishop and told him that all questions should be fully debated.

After this, Nectarius returned home, full of anxiety and consulted the Novatianist Bishop Agelius, who felt himself unsuited to arbitrate on such a controversy. However, he did have a reader, Sisinnius I of Constantinople, a philosopher and theologian, to whom he referred the argument with the Arians. Sisinnius I suggested that they should produce the testimonies of the old Fathers of the Church on the doctrine of the Son, and first ask the heads of the several parties whether they accepted these authorities or desired to anathematise them.

Both the Archbishop and the Emperor agreed to this suggestion and when the Bishops met, the Emperor asked whether they respected "...the teachers who lived before the Arian division?" They confirmed that they did and he then asked if they acknowledged, "... them sound and trustworthy witnesses of the true Christian doctrine?".

This question however produced divisions and so the emperor ordered each party to draw up a written confession of its doctrine. When this was done, the Bishops were summoned to the Imperial palace, where the emperor received them with kindness and retired to his study with their written confessions. Theodosius I however rejected and destroyed all except that of the orthodox, because he felt that the others introduced a division into the Holy Trinity.

After this, Theodosius I forbade all sectaries, except the Novatianists, to hold divine services or to publish their doctrines or to ordain clergy, under threat of severe civil penalties.

In 385 the emperor's wife Aelia Flaccilla and their daughter Pulcheria died. The archbishop asked Gregory of Nyssa to preach the funeral sermons for both of them.

Towards the close of his episcopate, Nectarius abolished the office of presbyter penitentiary, whose duty appears to have been to receive confessions before communion. His example was followed by nearly all other Bishops. The presbyter penitentiary was added to the ecclesiastical roll about the time of the Novatianist schism when that party declined to communicate with those who had lapsed in the Decian persecution. Gradually there were fewer lapsed to reconcile, and his duties became more closely connected with preparation for communion. Nectarius abolished the office due to a scandal that had occurred in connection with it.

Nectarius died in office on 27 September 397 and was succeeded by Saint John Chrysostom.

== Veneration ==
The Eastern Orthodox Church holds Nectarius as Saint, with a feast day of 11 October. He was venerated as a saint in the first millennium on 11 October.

== Notes and references ==
=== Attribution ===
- Sinclair references:
  - Karl Josef von Hefele, Hist. Christ. Councils, tr. Oxenham (Edinburg 1876), Vol. II, pp. 344, 347, 378, 380, 382;
  - Nectarii Arch. CP. Enarratio in Patrologia Graeca, xxxix, p. 1821;
  - Giovanni Domenico Mansi, Concil, t. iii, p. 521, 599, 633, 643, 694;
  - Socrates Scholasticus, H. E.; v, viii;
  - Sozomenus H. E.; vii, viii;
  - Theodoret H. E.; v, viii.

Titles of the Great Christian Church
| Preceded by Gregory of Nazianzus | Archbishop of Constantinople; 381 – 397 | Succeeded by John Chrysostom |
