= Nicene Christianity =

Denominations adhering to the Nicene Creed

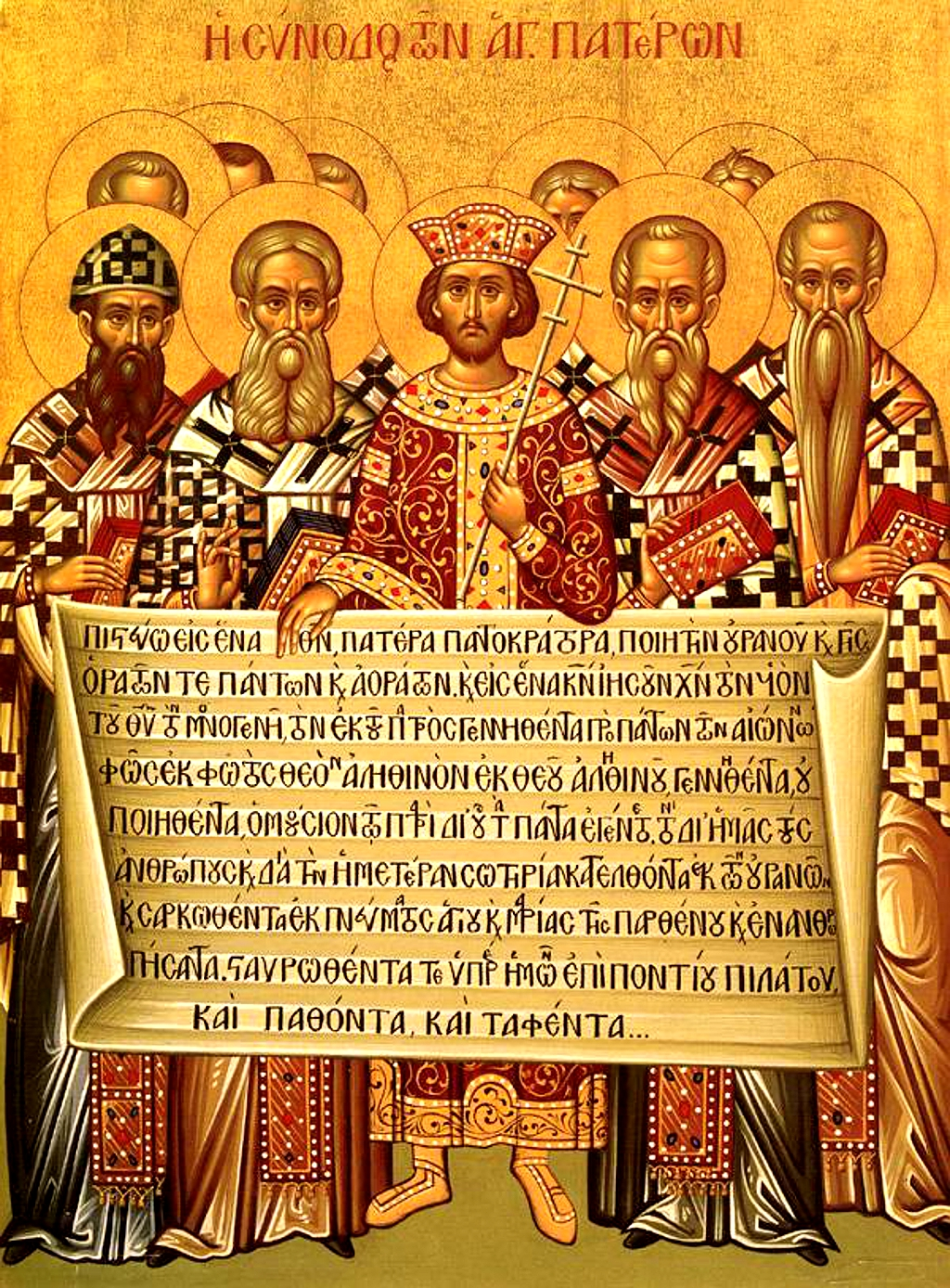
Icon depicting Emperor Constantine (center) and the Church Fathers of the First Council of Nicaea of 325 holding the Nicene Creed

Nicene Christianity includes those Christian denominations that adhere to the teaching of the Nicene Creed, which was formulated at the First Council of Nicaea in AD 325 and amended at the First Council of Constantinople in AD 381. It encompasses the vast majority of today's Christian churches.

== History ==
At the time of the First Council of Nicaea, the main rival of Nicene Christian doctrine was that of Arianism, which became eclipsed during the 7th century AD with the conversion of the Gothic kingdoms to Nicene Christianity. The main points of dissent between the two centered on Christology, or the nature of Jesus' divinity. Nicene Christianity regards Jesus as divine and co-eternal with God the Father, while Arianism treats him as the first among created beings and inferior to God the Father. Various other Nicene doctrines and beliefs have existed since the early medieval period, all of which have been considered heresies.

Religious historians and scholars often define Nicene Christianity as being the first incarnation of the state church of the Roman Empire that was officially endorsed by the Roman Emperors from 381. According to this definition, the Nicene Church ceased to exist following the Council of Chalcedon in 451, which was convened to address Christological disagreements on the human and divine natures of Christ, concluding that Christ had two distinct inseparable natures. Following the council, the Roman Empire established Chalcedonian Christianity as its official state religion; those churches which held that Christ was of a single nature were excommunicated by the Empire and became the Oriental Orthodox Churches.

(Not shown are ante-Nicene, nontrinitarian, and restorationist denominations.)

== Non-Nicene Christian denominations today ==
Today, examples of non-Nicene Christian denominations encompass both Protestant and non-Protestant non-trinitarian groups. Examples of these groups include the majority of the Latter Day Saint movement (with the exception of the Nicene Mormon group known as the Community of Christ, formerly known as the Reorganized Church of Jesus Christ of Latter Day Saints), Jehovah's Witnesses, the Unitarian Church of Transylvania, and Oneness Pentecostals.

== See also ==
- Church Fathers
- First seven ecumenical councils
- State church of the Roman Empire
