= Christianity as the Roman state religion =

In the year before the First Council of Constantinople in 381, Nicene Christianity became the official religion of the Roman Empire when Theodosius I, emperor of the East, Gratian, emperor of the West, and Gratian's junior co-ruler Valentinian II issued the Edict of Thessalonica in 380, which recognized the catholic orthodoxy, (Note: The Edict is the first which definitely introduces catholic orthodoxy as the established religion of the Roman world. It marks the end of the fourth-century religious controversy on the Trinity, occasioned by the Arian heresy and calling forth definitions of orthodox dogma by the Councils of Nicaea (325) and Constantinople (381). Acknowledgment of the true doctrine of the Trinity is made the test of State recognition. The citation of the Roman See as the yardstick of correct belief is significant; bracketing of the name of the Patriarch of Alexandria with that of the Pope was due to the Egyptian See's stalwart defence of the Trinitarian position, particularly under St. Athanasius. The last sentence of the Edict indicates that the Emperors contemplate the use of physical force in the service of orthodoxy; this is the first recorded instance of such a departure.) as defined by the Council of Nicea, as the Roman Empire's state religion. Historians refer to this state-sponsored church using a variety of terms: the catholic church, the orthodox church, the imperial church, the Roman church, or the Byzantine church, with some also used for wider communions extending beyond the Roman Empire. The Eastern Orthodox Church, Oriental Orthodoxy the Catholic Church and the Assyrian Church of the East all claim to stand in continuity from the Nicene Christian church to which Theodosius granted recognition. Political differences between the Eastern Roman Empire and the Persian Sassanid Empire led to the separation of the Church of the East in 424. A doctrinal split within the imperial church led to the independence of early Oriental Orthodoxy, while the fall of the Western Roman Empire initiated the gradual separation between Eastern and Western Christianity, culminating in the East-West schism of 1054. The Western Church evolved into the Latin (Catholic) Church while the Eastern Church that remained under the patronage of the Eastern empire evolved into the Greek Orthodox Church.

Earlier in the 4th century, following the Diocletianic Persecution of 303–313 and the Donatist controversy that arose in consequence, Constantine the Great had convened councils of bishops to define the orthodoxy of the Christian faith and to expand on earlier Christian councils. A series of ecumenical councils convened by successive Roman emperors met during the 4th and the 5th centuries, but Christianity continued to suffer rifts and schisms surrounding the theological and christological doctrines of Arianism, Nestorianism, Miaphysitism, and Dyophysitism. In the 5th century, the Western Roman Empire decayed as a polity; invaders sacked Rome in 410 and in 455, and Odoacer, an Arian barbarian warlord, forced Romulus Augustus, the last nominal Western Emperor, to abdicate in 476. However, apart from the aforementioned schisms, the church as an institution persisted in communion, if not without tension, between the East and West. In the 6th century, the Byzantine armies of the Byzantine Emperor Justinian I recovered Italy and other regions of the Western Mediterranean shore. The Byzantine Empire soon lost most of these gains, but it held Rome, as part of the Exarchate of Ravenna, until 751, a period known in church history as the Byzantine Papacy. The early Muslim conquests of the 7th–9th centuries would begin a process of converting most of the then-Christian world in the Levant, Middle East, North Africa, regions of Southern Italy and the Iberian Peninsula to Islam, severely restricting the reach both of the Byzantine Empire and of its church. Christian missionary activity directed from the capital of Constantinople did not lead to a lasting expansion of the formal link between the church and the Byzantine emperor, since areas outside the Byzantine Empire's political and military control set up their own distinct churches, as in the case of Bulgaria in 919.

Justinian I, who became emperor in 527, recognized the patriarchs of Rome, Constantinople, Alexandria, Antioch, and Jerusalem as the supreme authorities in the state-sponsored Chalcedonian church apparatus (see the Pentarchy). However, Justinian claimed "the right and duty of regulating by his laws the minutest details of worship and discipline, and also of dictating the theological opinions to be held in the Church".

In Justinian's day, the Christian church was not entirely under the emperor's control even in the East: the Church of the East had seceded due to the Council of Ephesus in 431, and the Oriental Orthodox Churches seceded due to the Council of Chalcedon in 451, and called the adherents of the imperially-recognized church "Melkites", from Syriac malkâniya ("imperial"). In Western Europe, Christianity was mostly subject to the laws and customs of nations that owed no allegiance to the emperor in Constantinople. While Eastern-born popes appointed or at least confirmed by the emperor continued to be loyal to him as their political lord, they refused to accept his authority in religious matters, or the authority of such a council as the imperially convoked Council of Hieria of 754. Pope Gregory III (731–741) was the last Bishop of Rome to ask the Byzantine ruler to ratify his election. With the crowning of Charlemagne by Pope Leo III on 25 December 800 as Imperator Romanorum, the political split between East and West became irrevocable. Spiritually, Chalcedonian Christianity persisted, at least in theory, as a unified entity until the Great Schism and its formal division with the mutual excommunication in 1054 of Rome and Constantinople. The empire finally collapsed with the Fall of Constantinople to the Islamic Ottoman Turks in 1453.

The obliteration of the empire's boundaries by Germanic peoples and an outburst of missionary activity among these peoples, who had no direct links with the empire, and among Pictic and Celtic peoples who had never been part of the Roman Empire, fostered the idea of a universal church free from association with a particular state. On the contrary, "in the East Roman or Byzantine view, when the Roman Empire became Christian, the perfect world order willed by God had been achieved: one universal empire was sovereign, and coterminous with it was the one universal church"; and the church came, by the time of the demise of the Byzantine Empire in 1453, to merge psychologically with it to the extent that its bishops had difficulty in thinking of Nicene Christianity without an emperor. (Note: In 1393, Patriarch Antony IV of Constantinople declared the Byzantine emperor to be "emperor (βασιλεύς) and autokrator of the Romans, that is of all Christians, and "it is not possible among Christians to have a Church and not to have an emperor. For the empire and the Church have great unity and commonality, and it is not possible to separate them".)

The legacy of the idea of a universal church carries on in today's Catholic Church, Eastern Orthodox Church, Oriental Orthodox Churches, and the Church of the East. Many other churches, such as the Anglican Communion, claim succession to this universal church.

== History ==
=== Early Christianity in relation to the state ===
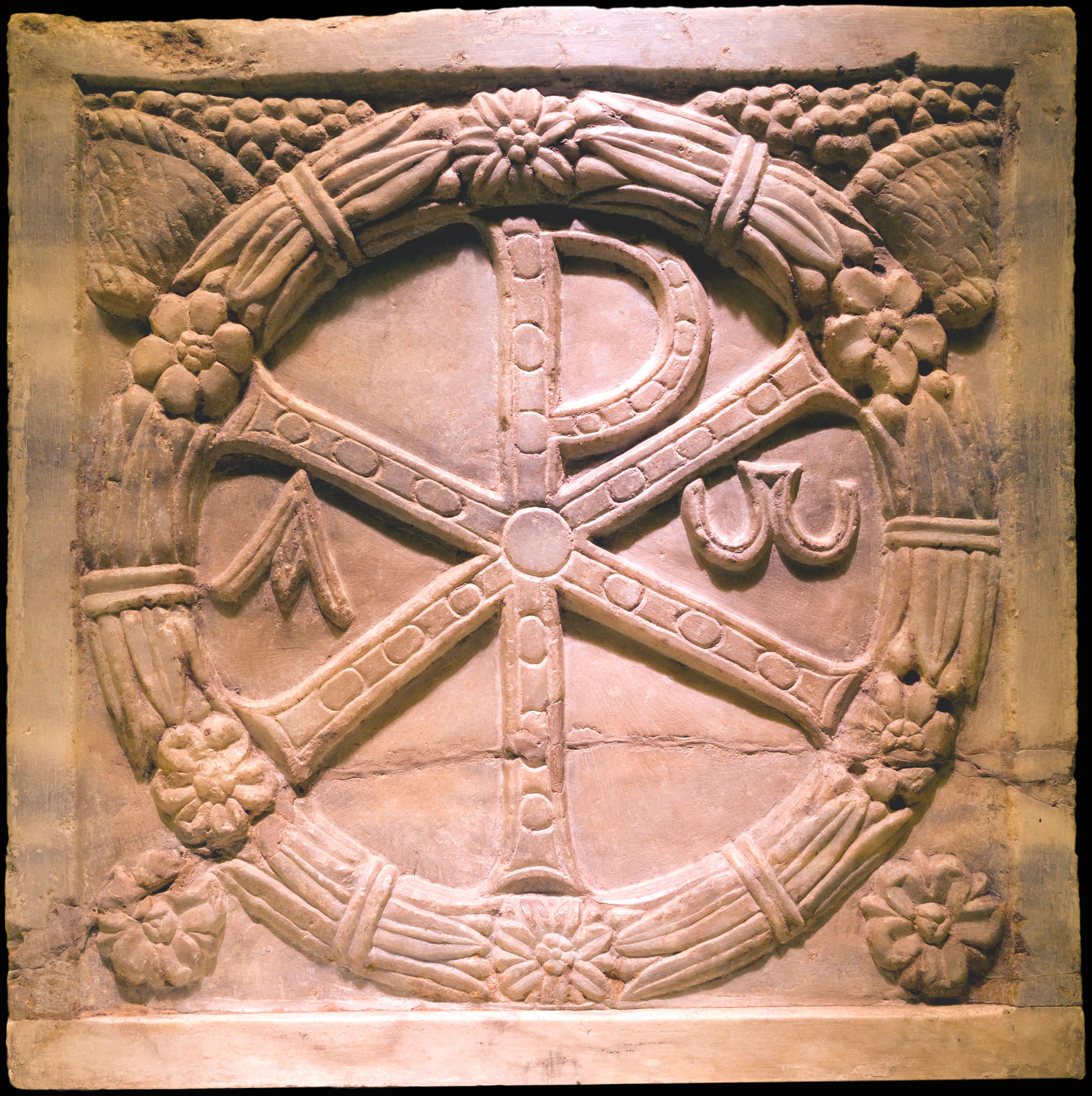
Monogramme of Christ (the Chi Rho) on a plaque of a sarcophagus, 4th-century AD, marble, Musei Vaticani, on display in a temporary exhibition at the Colosseum in Rome, Italy

Before the end of the 1st century, the Roman authorities recognized Christianity as a separate religion from Judaism. The distinction, perhaps already made in practice at the time of the Great Fire of Rome in the year 64, was given official status by the emperor Nerva around the year 98 by granting Christians exemption from paying the Fiscus Iudaicus, the annual tax upon the Jews. Pliny the Younger, when propraetor in Bithynia in 103, assumes in his letters to Trajan that because Christians do not pay the tax, they are not Jews.

Since paying taxes had been one of the ways that Jews demonstrated their goodwill and loyalty toward the empire, Christians had to negotiate their own alternatives to participating in the imperial cult. Their refusal to worship the Roman gods or to pay homage to the emperor as divine resulted at times in persecution and martyrdom. Church Father Tertullian, for instance, attempted to argue that Christianity was not inherently treasonous, and that Christians could offer their own form of prayer for the well-being of the emperor.

Christianity spread especially in the eastern parts of the empire and beyond its border; in the west it was at first relatively limited, but significant Christian communities emerged in Rome, Carthage, and other urban centers, becoming by the end of the 3rd century, the dominant faith in some of them. Christians accounted for approximately 10% of the Roman population by 300, according to some estimates. Christianity then rapidly grew in the 4th century — Rodney Stark estimated that Christians accounted for 56.5% of the Roman population by 350. According to Will Durant, the Christian Church prevailed over paganism because it offered a much more attractive doctrine and because the church leaders addressed human needs better than their rivals.

In 301, the Kingdom of Armenia, nominally a Roman client kingdom but ruled by a Parthian dynasty, became the first nation to adopt Christianity as its state religion, with the possible exception of Osroene in 201.

=== Establishment and early controversies ===
Major communions of the 4th, 5th, and 6th centuries
Communion	Major churches	Primary centers
Chalcedonian; Christianity (after 451)	Catholic/Orthodox Church; Georgian Church; Church of Carthage; Church of Cyprus; Maronite Church (Note: the Maronite Church was created by Maron in 410, and in 685 AD Pope Sergius I made John Maron the first Maronite Patriarch.)	Rome, Alexandria, Antioch, Constantinople, Georgian Kingdoms (Colchis and Iberia); Carthage; Province of Cyprus; Phoenicia
Nestorianism (after 431)	Persian church	Syria, India, China; Sassanid Empire (Persia)
Miaphysitism (after 451)	Armenian Church; Coptic Church; Syriac Church; Ethiopian Church	Armenia, Syria, Egypt
Donatism (largely ended after 411)		North Africa
Arianism		parts of Eastern Roman Empire until 380; Gothic tribes

In 311, with the Edict of Serdica the dying Emperor Galerius ended the Diocletianic Persecution that he is reputed to have instigated, and in 313, Emperor Constantine issued the Edict of Milan, granting to Christians and others "the right of open and free observance of their worship".

Constantine began to employ Christian symbols such as the Chi Rho early in his reign but still encouraged traditional Roman religious practices including sun worship. In 330, Constantine established the city of Constantinople as the new capital of the Roman Empire. The city would gradually come to be seen as the intellectual and cultural center of the Christian world.

Over the course of the 4th century the Christian body became consumed by debates surrounding orthodoxy, i.e. which religious doctrines are the correct ones. In the early 4th century, a group in North Africa, later called Donatists, who believed in a very rigid interpretation of Christianity that excluded many who had abandoned the faith during the Diocletianic Persecution, created a crisis in the western empire.

A synod was held in Rome in 313, followed by another in Arles in 314. These synods ruled that the Donatist faith was heresy and, when the Donatists refused to recant, Constantine launched the first campaign of persecution by Christians against Christians, and began imperial involvement in Christian theology. However, during the reign of Emperor Julian the Apostate, the Donatists, who formed the majority party in the Roman province of Africa for 30 years, were given official approval.

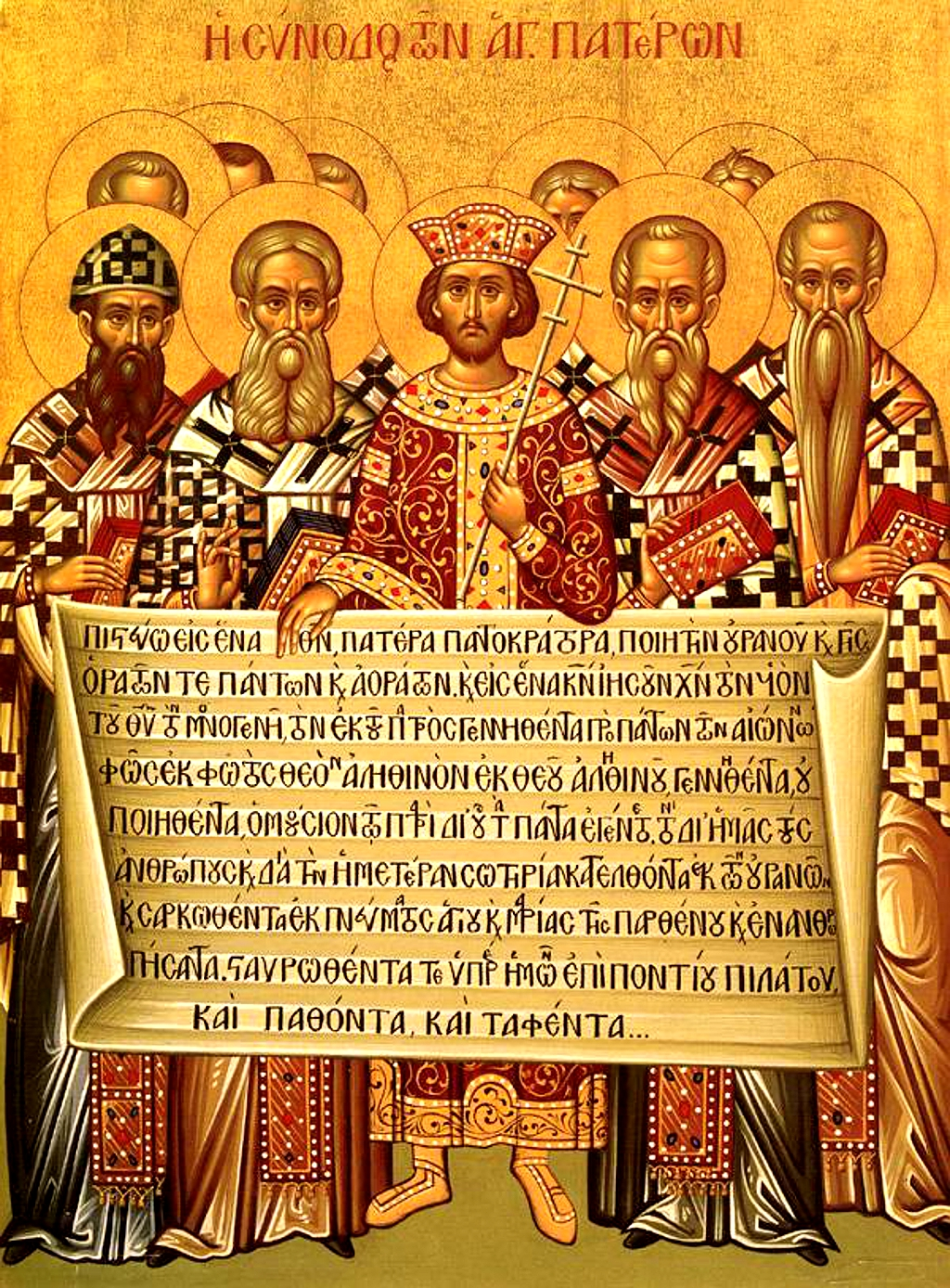
Icon depicting Constantine and the bishops of the Council of Nicaea (325). The centrally placed and haloed Emperor holds the Creed of the First Council of Constantinople (381).

==== Debates within Christianity ====
Christian scholars and populace within the empire were increasingly embroiled in debates regarding christology (i.e., regarding the nature of the Christ). Opinions ranged from belief that Jesus was entirely human to belief that he was entirely divine. The most persistent debate was that between the homoousian view (the Father and the Son are of one substance), defined at the Council at Nicaea in 325 and later championed by Athanasius of Alexandria, and the Arian view (the Father and the Son are similar, but the Father is greater than the Son). Emperors thereby became ever more involved with the increasingly divided early Church.

Constantine backed the Nicene Creed of Nicaea, but was baptized on his deathbed by the Eusebius of Nicomedia, a bishop with Arian sympathies. His successor Constantius II supported Arian positions: under his rule, the Council of Constantinople in 360 supported the Arian view. After the interlude of Emperor Julian, who wanted to return to the pagan Roman/Greek religion, the west stuck to the Nicene Creed, while Arianism or Semi-Arianism was dominant in the east (under Emperor Valens), until Emperor Theodosius I called the Council of Constantinople in 381, which reasserted the Nicene view and rejected the Arian view. This council further refined the definition of orthodoxy, issuing the Nicene-Constantinopolitan Creed.

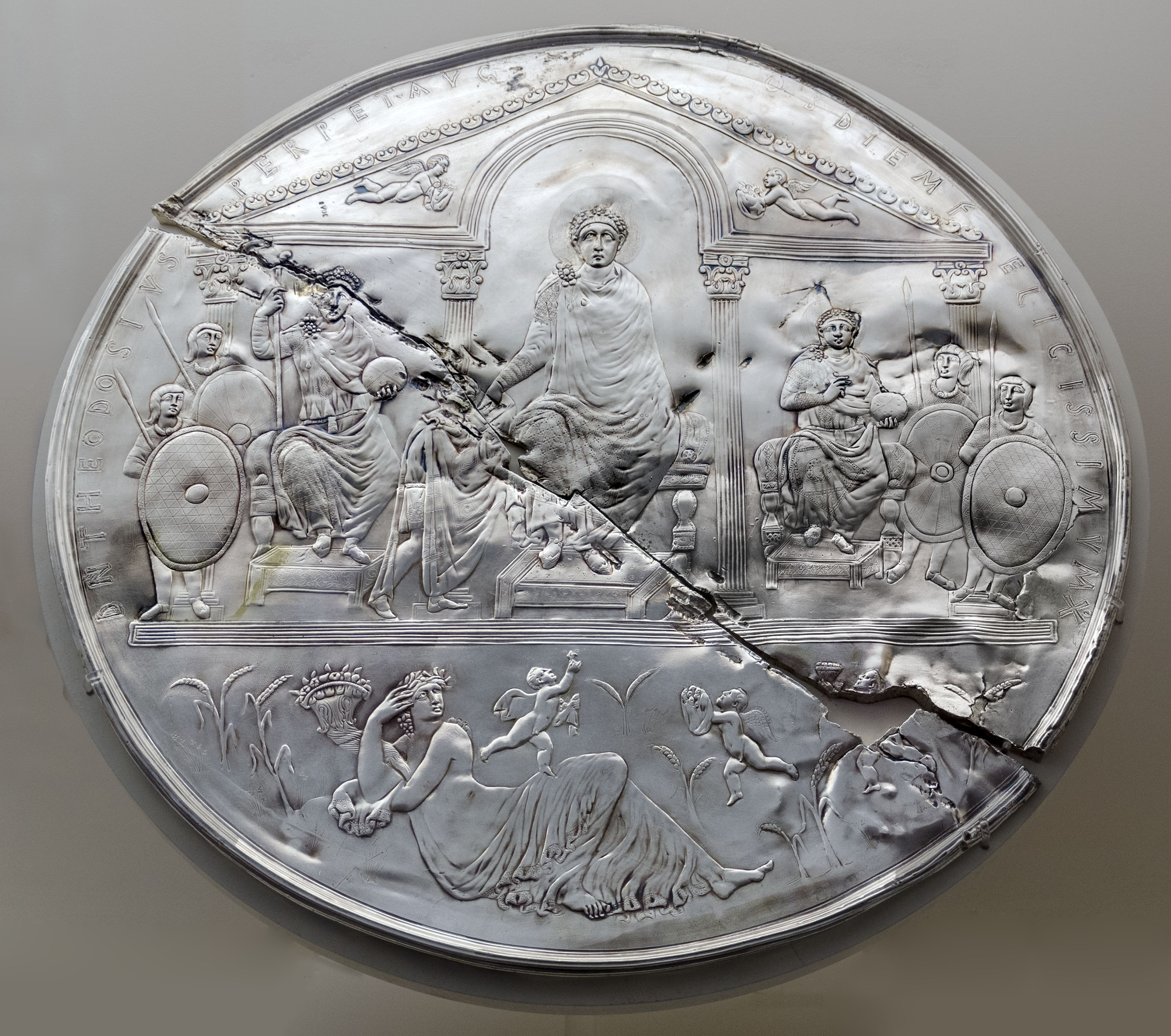
Missorium of Emperor Theodosius I, who declared Nicene Christianity to be the State religion of the Roman Empire. This piece was found in Almendralejo, Spain.

On 27 February of the previous year, Theodosius I established, with the Edict of Thessalonica, the Christianity of the First Council of Nicaea as the official state religion, reserving for its followers the title of Catholic Christians and declaring that those who did not follow the religion taught by Pope Damasus I of Rome and Pope Peter of Alexandria were to be called heretics:

It is our desire that all the various nations which are subject to our Clemency and Moderation, should continue to profess that religion which was delivered to the Romans by the divine Apostle Peter, as it has been preserved by faithful tradition, and which is now professed by the Pontiff Damasus and by Peter, Bishop of Alexandria, a man of apostolic holiness. According to the apostolic teaching and the doctrine of the Gospel, let us believe in the one deity of the Father, the Son and the Holy Spirit, in equal majesty and in a holy Trinity. We authorize the followers of this law to assume the title of Catholic Christians; but as for the others, since, in our judgment they are foolish madmen, we decree that they shall be branded with the ignominious name of heretics, and shall not presume to give to their conventicles the name of churches. They will suffer in the first place the chastisement of the divine condemnation and in the second the punishment of our authority which in accordance with the will of Heaven we shall decide to inflict.

— Edict of Thessalonica

In 391, Theodosius closed all the "pagan" (non-Christian and non-Jewish) temples and formally forbade pagan worship.

=== Late antiquity ===
Changes in extent of the Empire ruled from Constantinople. 476 End of the Western Empire; 550 Conquests of Justinian I; 717 Accession of Leo the Isaurian; 867 Accession of Basil I; 1025 Death of Basil II; 1095 Eve of the First Crusade; 1170 Under Manuel I; 1270 Under Michael VIII Palaiologos; 1400 Before the fall of Constantinople

At the end of the 4th century the Roman Empire had effectively split into two parts although their economies and the imperial-recognized church were still strongly tied. The two halves of the empire had always had cultural differences, exemplified in particular by the widespread use of the Greek language in the Eastern Empire and its more limited use in the West (Greek, as well as Latin, was used in the West, but Latin was the spoken vernacular).

By the time Christianity became the state religion of the empire at the end of the 4th century, scholars in the West had largely abandoned Greek in favor of Latin. Even the Church in Rome, where Greek continued to be used in the liturgy longer than in the provinces, abandoned Greek. (Note: "The first Christians in Rome were chiefly people who came from the East and spoke Greek. The founding of Constantinople naturally drew such people thither rather than to Rome, and then Christianity at Rome began to spread among the Roman population, so that at last the bulk of the Christian population in Rome spoke Latin. Hence the change in the language of the liturgy. … The liturgy was said (in Latin) first in one church and then in more, until the Greek liturgy was driven out, and the clergy ceased to know Greek. About 415 or 420 we find a Pope saying that he is unable to answer a letter from some Eastern bishops, because he has no one who could write Greek".) Jerome's Vulgate had begun to replace the older Latin translations of the Bible.

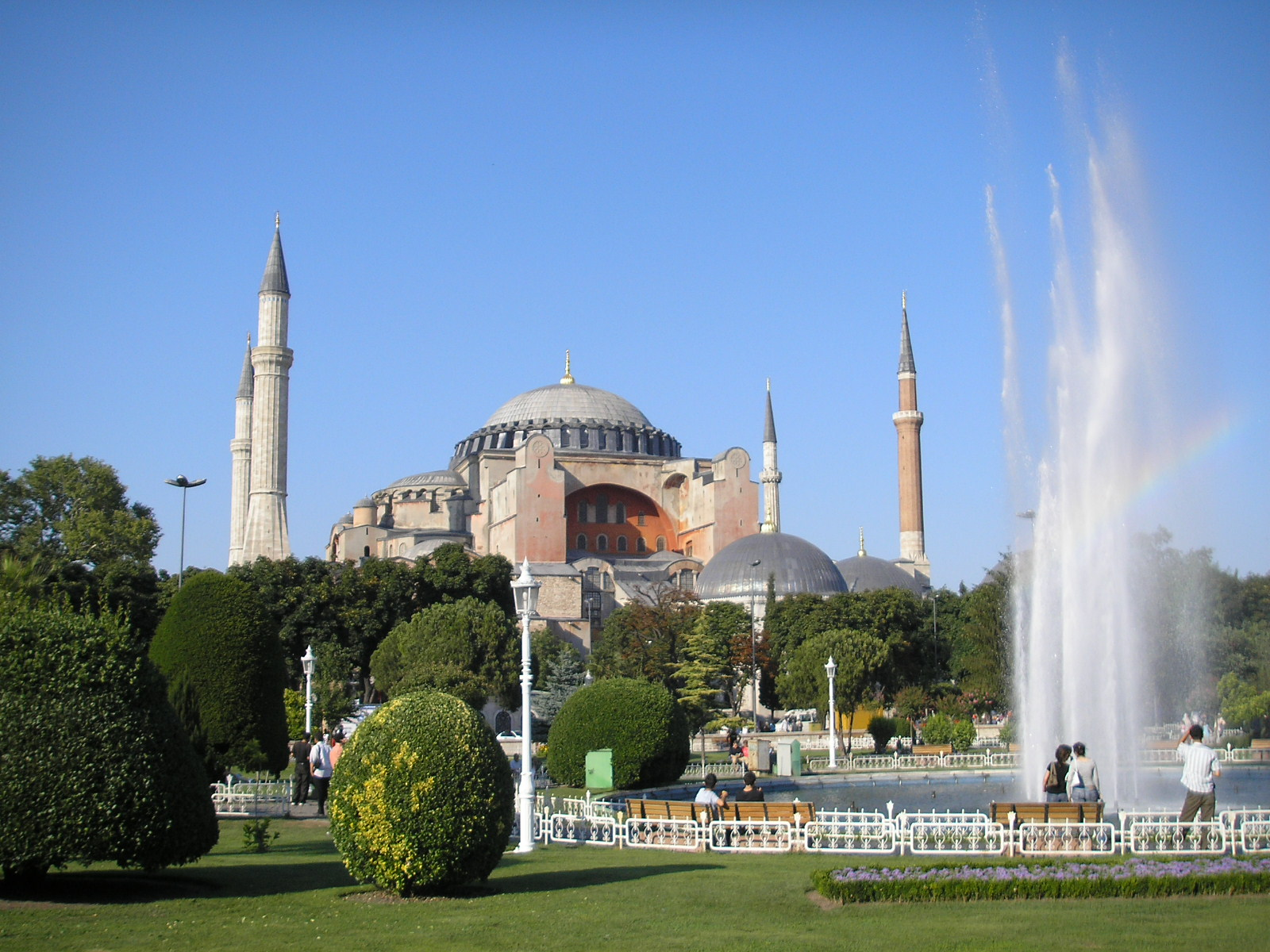
The Hagia Sophia basilica in Constantinople, for centuries the largest church building in the world.

The 5th century would see the further fracturing of Christendom. Emperor Theodosius II called two synods in Ephesus, one in 431 and one in 449, the first of which condemned the teachings of Patriarch Nestorius of Constantinople, while the second supported the teachings of Eutyches against Archbishop Flavian of Constantinople.

Nestorius taught that Christ's divine and human nature were distinct persons, and hence Mary was the mother of Christ but not the mother of God. Eutyches taught on the contrary that there was in Christ only a single nature, different from that of human beings in general. The First Council of Ephesus rejected Nestorius' view, causing churches centered around the School of Edessa, a city at the edge of the empire, to break with the imperial church (see Nestorian schism).

Persecuted within the Roman Empire, many Nestorians fled to Persia and joined the Sassanid Church (the future Church of the East). The Second Council of Ephesus upheld the view of Eutyches, but was overturned two years later by the Council of Chalcedon, called by Emperor Marcian. Rejection of the Council of Chalcedon led to the exodus from the state church of the majority of Christians in Egypt and many in the Levant, who preferred Miaphysite theology.

Thus, within a century of the link established by Theodosius between the emperor and the church in his empire, it suffered a significant diminishment. Those who upheld the Council of Chalcedon became known in Syriac as Melkites, the imperial group, followers of the emperor (in Syriac, malka). This schism resulted in an independent communion of churches, including the Egyptian, Syrian, Ethiopian and Armenian churches, that is today known as Oriental Orthodoxy. In spite of these schisms, however, the Chalcedonian Nicene church still represented the majority of Christians within the by now already diminished Roman Empire.

==== End of the Western Roman Empire ====
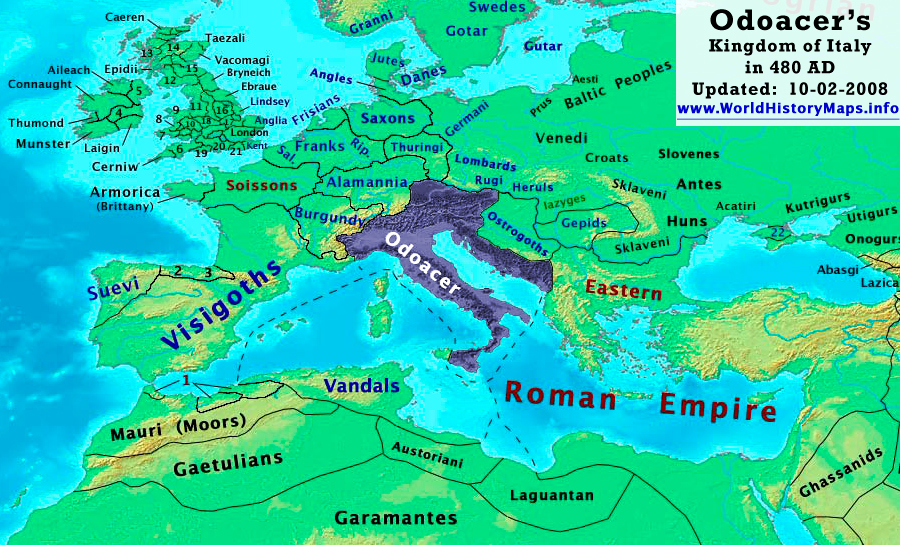
Odoacer's kingdom in 480, after annexing Dalmatia and most of Sicily.

In the 5th century, the Western Empire rapidly decayed and by the end of the century was no more. Within a few decades, Germanic tribes, particularly the Goths and Vandals, conquered the western provinces. Rome was sacked in 410 and 455, and was to be sacked again in the following century in 546.

By 476, the Germanic chieftain Odoacer had conquered Italy and deposed the last western emperor, Romulus Augustus, though he nominally submitted to the authority of Constantinople. The Arian Germanic tribes established their own systems of churches and bishops in the western provinces but were generally tolerant of the population who chose to remain in communion with the imperial church.

In 533, Roman Emperor Justinian in Constantinople launched a military campaign to reclaim the western provinces from the Arian Germans, starting with North Africa and proceeding to Italy. His success in recapturing much of the western Mediterranean was temporary. The empire soon lost most of these gains, but held Rome, as part of the Exarchate of Ravenna, until 751.

Justinian definitively established Caesaropapism, believing "he had the right and duty of regulating by his laws the minutest details of worship and discipline, and also of dictating the theological opinions to be held in the Church". According to the entry in Liddell & Scott, the term orthodox first occurs in the Codex Justinianus: "We direct that all Catholic churches, throughout the entire world, shall be placed under the control of the orthodox bishops who have embraced the Nicene Creed."

By the end of the 6th century the church within the Empire had become firmly tied with the imperial government, while in the west Christianity was mostly subject to the laws and customs of nations that owed no allegiance to the emperor.

=== Patriarchates in the Empire ===
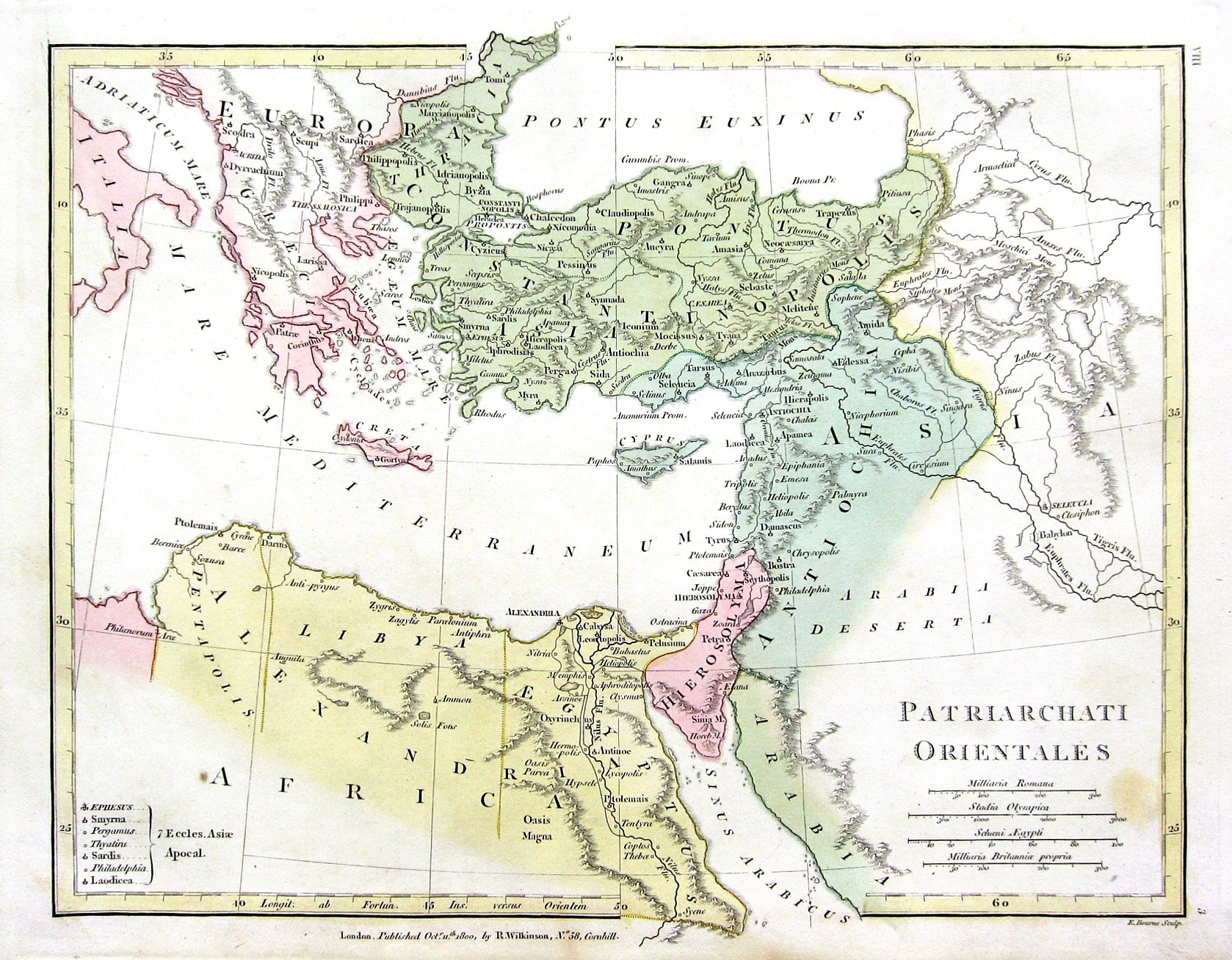
A map of the five patriarchates in the Eastern Mediterranean as constituted by Justinian I. Rome is coloured in pink, Constantinople in green, Antioch in blue, Jerusalem in pink and Alexandria in yellow. Leo III extended the jurisdiction of Constantinople to the territories bordered in pink.

Emperor Justinian I assigned to five sees, those of Rome, Constantinople, Alexandria, Antioch and Jerusalem, a superior ecclesial authority that covered the whole of his empire. The First Council of Nicaea in 325 reaffirmed that the bishop of a provincial capital, the metropolitan bishop, had a certain authority over the bishops of the province. But it also recognized the existing supra-metropolitan authority of the sees of Rome, Alexandria and Antioch, and granted special recognition to Jerusalem.

Constantinople was added at the First Council of Constantinople (381) and given authority initially only over Thrace. By a canon of contested validity, the Council of Chalcedon (451) placed Asia and Pontus, which together made up Anatolia, under Constantinople, although their autonomy had been recognized at the council of 381.

Rome never recognized this pentarchy of five sees as constituting the leadership of the church. It maintained that, in accordance with the First Council of Nicaea, only the three "Petrine" sees of Rome, Alexandria and Antioch had a real patriarchal function. The canons of the Quinisext Council of 692, which gave ecclesiastical sanction to Justinian's decree, were also never fully accepted by the Western Church.

Early Muslim conquests of the territories of the patriarchates of Alexandria, Antioch and Jerusalem, most of whose Christians were in any case lost to the orthodox church since the aftermath of the Council of Chalcedon, left in effect only two patriarchates, those of Rome and Constantinople. In 732, Emperor Leo III's iconoclast policies were resisted by Pope Gregory III. The Emperor reacted by transferring to the ecclesiastical jurisdiction of Constantinople in 740 the territories in Greece, Illyria, Sicily and Calabria that had been under Rome (see map), leaving the bishop of Rome with only a minute part of the lands over which the empire still had control.

The Patriarch of Constantinople had already adopted the title of "ecumenical patriarch", indicating what he saw as his position in the oikoumene, the Christian world ideally headed by the emperor and the patriarch of the emperor's capital. Also under the influence of the imperial model of governance of the state church, in which "the emperor becomes the actual executive organ of the universal Church", the pentarchy model of governance of the state church regressed to a monarchy of the Patriarch of Constantinople.

=== Rise of Islam ===
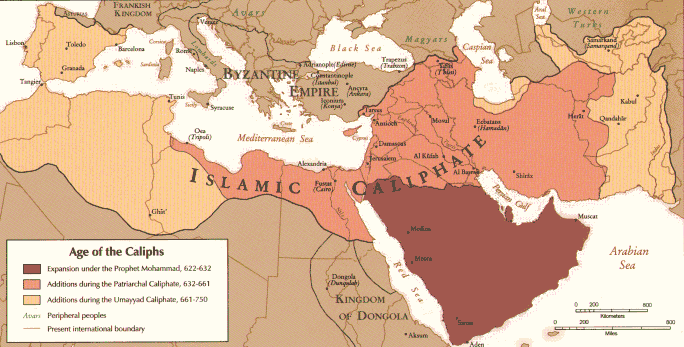
A map of Muslim expansion in the 7th and 8th centuries.

The Rashidun conquests began to expand the sway of Islam beyond Arabia in the 7th century, first clashing with the Roman Empire in 634. That empire and the Sassanid Persian Empire were at that time crippled by decades of war between them. By the late 8th century the Umayyad caliphate had conquered all of Persia and much of the Byzantine territory including Egypt, Palestine, and Syria.

Suddenly, much of the Christian world was under Muslim rule. Over the coming centuries the successive Muslim states became some of the most powerful in the Mediterranean world.

Though the Byzantine church claimed religious authority over Christians in Egypt and the Levant, in reality the majority of Christians in these regions were by then miaphysites and members of other sects. The new Muslim rulers, in contrast, offered religious tolerance to Christians of all sects. Additionally subjects of the Muslim Empire could be accepted as Muslims simply by declaring a belief in a single deity and reverence for Muhammad (see shahada). As a result, the peoples of Egypt, Palestine and Syria largely accepted their new rulers and many declared themselves Muslims within a few generations. Muslim incursions later found success in parts of Europe, particularly Spain (see Al-Andalus).

=== Expansion of Christianity in Europe ===
The spread of Christianity in Europe by 325 AD (dark blue) and 600 AD (light blue).

During the 9th century, the Emperor in Constantinople encouraged missionary expeditions to nearby nations including the Muslim caliphate, and the Turkic Khazars. In 862 he sent Saints Cyril and Methodius to Slavic Great Moravia. By then most of the Slavic population of Bulgaria was Christian and Tsar Boris I himself was baptized in 864. Serbia was accounted Christian by about 870. In early 867 Patriarch Photios I of Constantinople wrote that Christianity was accepted by the Kievan Rus', which however was definitively Christianized only at the close of the following century.

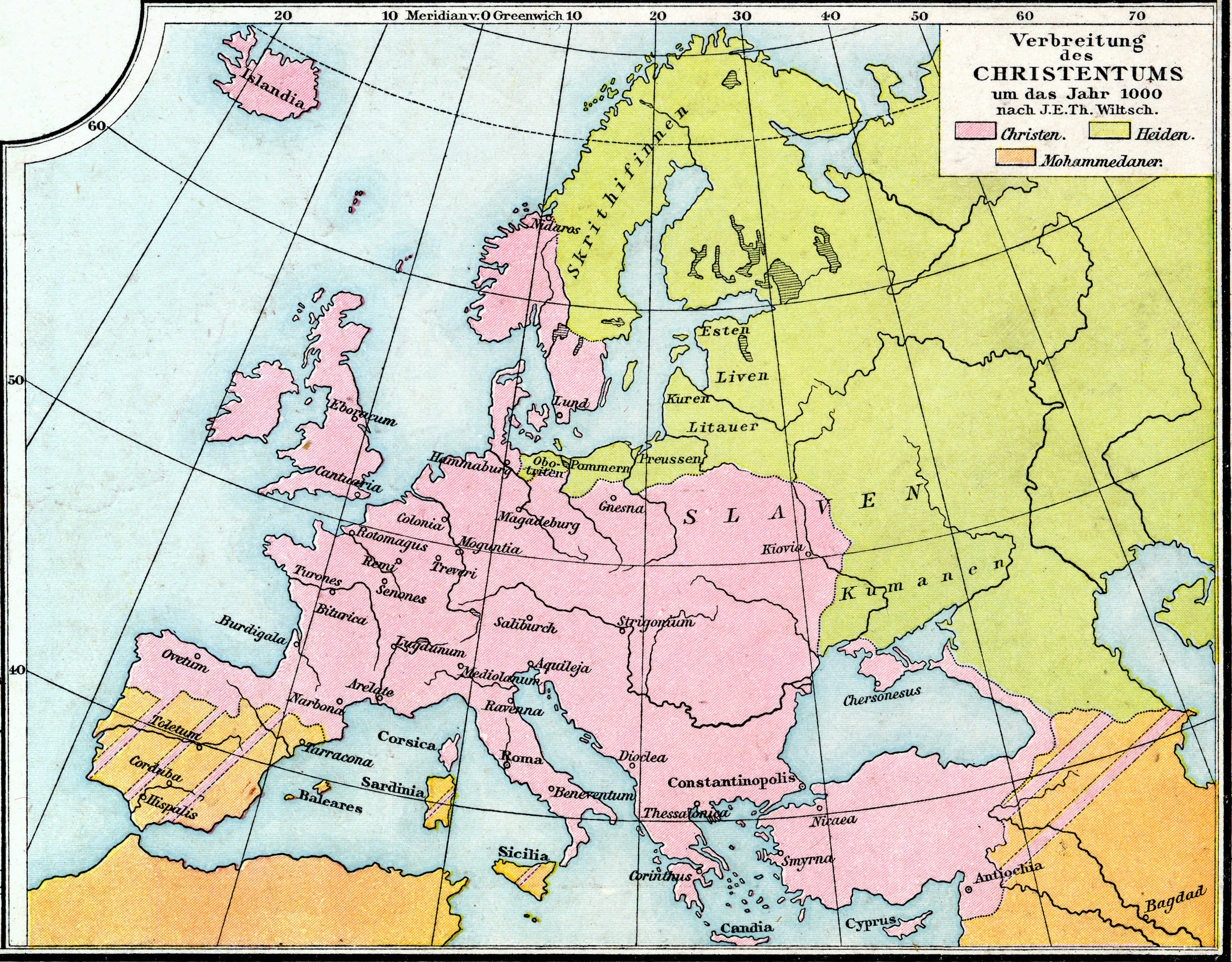
The spread of Christianity in Europe by 1000.

Of these, the Church in Great Moravia chose immediately to link with Rome, not Constantinople: the missionaries sent there sided with the Pope during the Photian Schism (863–867). After decisive victories over the Byzantines at Acheloos and Katasyrtai, Bulgaria declared its church autocephalous and elevated it to the rank of patriarchate, an autonomy recognized in 927 by Constantinople, but abolished by Emperor Basil II Bulgaroktonos (the Bulgar-Slayer) after his 1018 conquest of Bulgaria.

In Serbia, which became an independent kingdom in the early 13th century, Stephen Uroš IV Dušan, after conquering a large part of Byzantine territory in Europe and assuming the title of Tsar, raised the Serbian archbishop to the rank of patriarch in 1346, an autonomy recognized in 1375 by Constantinople, a rank maintained until after the fall of the Byzantine Empire to the Turks. No Byzantine emperor ever ruled Russian Christendom.

Expansion of the church in western and northern Europe began much earlier, with the conversion of the Irish in the 5th century, the Franks at the end of the same century, the Arian Visigoths in Spain soon afterwards, and the English at the end of the 6th century. By the time the Byzantine missions to central and eastern Europe began, Christian western Europe, in spite of losing most of Spain to Islam, encompassed Germany and part of Scandinavia, and, apart from the south of Italy, was independent of the Byzantine Empire and had been almost entirely so for centuries.

This situation fostered the idea of a universal church linked to no one particular state. Long before the Byzantine Empire came to an end, Poland also, Hungary and other central European peoples were part of a church that in no way saw itself as the empire's church and that, with the East-West Schism, had even ceased to be in communion with it.

=== East–West Schism (1054) ===
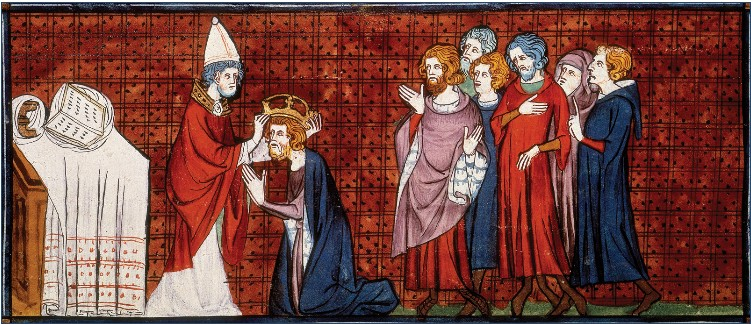
The coronation of Charlemagne as emperor.

With the defeat and death in 751 of the last Exarch of Ravenna and the end of the Exarchate, Rome ceased to be part of the Byzantine Empire. Forced to seek protection elsewhere, the popes turned to the Franks and, with the coronation of Charlemagne by Pope Leo III on 25 December 800, transferred their political allegiance to a rival Roman emperor. Disputes between the see of Rome, which claimed authority over all other sees, and that of Constantinople, which was now without rival in the empire, culminated perhaps inevitably in mutual excommunications in 1054.

Communion with Constantinople was broken off by European Christians with the exception of those ruled by the empire (including the Bulgarians and Serbs) and of the fledgling Kievan or Russian Church, then a metropolitanate of the patriarchate of Constantinople. This church became independent only in 1448, just five years before the extinction of the empire, after which the Turkish authorities included all their Orthodox Christian subjects of whatever ethnicity in a single millet headed by the Patriarch of Constantinople.

The Westerners who set up Crusader states in Greece and the Middle East appointed Latin (Western) patriarchs and other hierarchs, thus giving concrete reality and permanence to the schism. Efforts were made in 1274 (Second Council of Lyon) and 1439 (Council of Florence) to restore communion between East and West, but the agreements reached by the participating eastern delegations and by the emperor were rejected by the vast majority of Byzantine Christians.

In the East, the idea that the Byzantine emperor was the head of Christians everywhere persisted among churchmen as long as the empire existed, even when its actual territory was reduced to very little. In 1393, only 60 years before the fall of the capital, Patriarch Antony IV of Constantinople wrote to Basil I of Muscovy defending the liturgical commemoration in Russian churches of the Byzantine emperor on the grounds that he was "emperor (βασιλεύς) and autokrator of the Romans, that is of all Christians". According to Patriarch Antony, "it is not possible among Christians to have a Church and not to have an emperor. For the empire and the Church have great unity and commonality, and it is not possible to separate them", and "the holy emperor is not like the rulers and governors of other regions".

== Legacy ==
Following the schism between the Eastern and Western churches, various emperors sought at times but without success to reunite Christendom, invoking the notion of Christian unity between East and West in an attempt to obtain assistance from the pope and Western Europe against the Muslims who were gradually conquering the empire's territory. But the period of the Western Crusades against the Muslims had passed before even the first of the two reunion councils was held.

Even when persecuted by the emperor, the Eastern Church, George Pachymeres said, "counted the days until they should be rid not of their emperor (for they could no more live without an emperor than a body without a heart), but of their current misfortunes". The church had come to merge psychologically in the minds of the Eastern bishops with the empire to such an extent that they had difficulty in thinking of Christianity without an emperor.

In Western Europe, on the other hand, the idea of a universal church linked to the Emperor of Constantinople was replaced by that in which the Roman see was supreme. (Note: "It was the papacy also which kept alive in western Europe the ideal of a universal imperial Church, for the whole of western Christendom came to acknowledge the supremacy of the Roman see".) "Membership in a universal church replaced citizenship in a universal empire. Across Europe, from Italy to Ireland, a new society centered on Christianity was forming."

The Western Church came to emphasize the term Catholic in its identity, an assertion of universality, while the Eastern Church came to emphasize the term Orthodox in its identity, an assertion of holding to the true teachings of Jesus. Both churches claim to be the unique continuation of the previously united state-sanctioned Chalcedonian and Nicene Church, whose core doctrinal formulations have been retained also by many of the churches that emerged from the Protestant Reformation, including Lutheranism and Anglicanism.

== See also ==
- Arian controversy
- Caesaropapism
- Chalcedonian Christianity
- Christian state
- Early Christianity
- History of the Eastern Orthodox Church
- History of Oriental Orthodoxy
- History of Roman Catholicism

== Literature ==
- Amory, Patrick (16 October 2003). People and Identity in Ostrogothic Italy, 489–554. Cambridge, MA: Cambridge University Press. ISBN 978-0-521-52635-7.
- Anderson, Lara; et al. (2010). World and Its Peoples. Marshall Cavendish. ISBN 978-0-7614-7883-6.
- Ayer, John Cullen, ed. (1913). A Source Book for Ancient Church History. Mundus Publishing (2008 reprint).
- Bettenson, Henry Scowcroft, ed. (1967). Documents of the Christian Church (2nd ed.). London: Oxford University Press. ISBN 978-0-19-501293-4.
- Boak, Arthur Edward Romilly (1921). A history of Rome to 565 A. D. New York: Macmillan.
- Bury, J B (1923). History of the Later Roman Empire: From the Death of Theodosius I. BiblioLife. ISBN 978-1-113-20104-1.
- Cairns, Earle E. (1996). Christianity through the centuries: a history of the Christian church (3rd ed.). Zondervan. ISBN 978-0-310-20812-9.
- Bussell, Frederick William (1910). The Roman Empire: Essays on the constitutional history from the accession of Domitian to the retirement of Niceophorus III. New York: Longmans, Green, and Co.
- Cardini, Franco (2001). Europe and Islam. Hoboken, NJ: Wiley. ISBN 978-0-631-22637-6.
- Carroll, Warren H. (1987). The Building of Christendom. ISBN 978-0-931888-24-3.
- Chaurasia, Radhey Shyam (2001). History of Western Political Thought. New Delhi, India: Atlantic Publishers. ISBN 978-81-269-0033-6.
- Drobner, Hubertus R.; Schatzmann, Siegfried S. (2007). The fathers of the church: a comprehensive introduction. Peabody, MA: Hendrickson Publishers. ISBN 978-1-56563-331-5.
- Dwyer, John C. (1998). Church History: Twenty Centuries of Catholic Christianity. Mahwah, NJ: Paulist Press. ISBN 978-0-8091-3830-2.
- Ekonomou, Andrew J. (2007). Byzantine Rome and the Greek Popes. Lexington Books. ISBN 978-0-7391-1977-8.
- Fahlbusch, Erwin (2008). The Encyclopedia of Christianity (volume 5). Eerdmans. ISBN 978-0-8028-2417-2.
- Forster, Greg (2008). The Contested Public Square: The Crisis of Christianity and Politics. InterVarsity Press. ISBN 978-0-8308-2880-7.
- Fortescue, Adrian (1908). The Orthodox Eastern Church (2nd ed.). Catholic Truth Society.
- Goodenough, Erwin Ramsdell (1970). The church in the Roman Empire. New York: H. Holt and Company. ISBN 978-0-8154-0337-1.
- Granfield, Patrick (2000). The Gift of the Church: A Textbook Ecclesiology. Liturgical Press. ISBN 978-0-8146-5931-1.
- Greer, Rowan A. (1989). The fear of freedom: a study of miracles in the Roman imperial church. Pennsylvania State University. ISBN 978-0-271-00648-2.
- Honoré, Tony (1998). Law in the Crisis of Empire 379-455 AD. Oxford University Press. ISBN 978-0-19-826078-3.
- Hopkins, Keith (1998). "Christian Number and Its Implications". Journal of Early Christian Studies. 6 (2): 185–226. doi:10.1353/earl.1998.0035. S2CID 170769034.
- Irvin, Dale T., Sunquist, Scott (2002). History of the World Christian Movement. Vol. 1. Edinburgh, Scotland: T & T Clark Publishers. ISBN 978-0-567-08866-6.
- Jedin, Hubert; Dolan, John (1980). The Imperial Church from Constantine to the Early Middle Ages. Burns & Oates. ISBN 978-0-86012-084-1.
- Latourette, Kenneth Scott (1975). A history of Christianity. Vol. 1. New York: Harper Collins. ISBN 978-0-06-064952-4.
- McManners, John (2001). The Oxford illustrated history of Christianity. Oxford University Press. ISBN 978-0-19-285439-1.
- Medlycott, A. E. (1905). India and the Apostle Thomas: an inquiry with a critical analysis of the Acta Thomae. London: David Nutt.
- Noble, Thomas F.X. (1984). The Republic of St Peter. University of Pennsylvania Press. ISBN 978-0-8122-1239-6.
- Meyendorff, John (1996). Rome, Constantinople, Moscow: Historical and Theological Studies. Crestwood, NY: St. Vladimir's Seminary Press. ISBN 978-0-88141-134-8.
- O'Hare, Padraic (1997). The enduring covenant: the education of Christians and the end of antisemitism. Valley Forge, PA: Trinity Press International. ISBN 978-1-56338-186-7.
- O'Leary, De Lacy (2000). Arabia Before Muhammad. Routledge. ISBN 978-0-415-24466-4.
- Payton, James R. (26 July 2007). Light from the Christian East: An Introduction to the Orthodox Tradition. Downers Grove, IL: Invervarsity Press. ISBN 978-0-8308-2594-3.
- Pelikan, Jaroslav Jan (2005). Creeds and confessions of faith in the Christian tradition. Yale University Press. ISBN 978-0-300-10974-0.
- Price, Richard; Gaddis, Michael (2005). The acts of the Council of Chalcedon. Vol. 3. Liverpool, England: Liverpool University Press. ISBN 978-0-85323-039-7.
- Ruether, Rosemary Radford (2008). Christianity and Social Systems: Historical Constructions and Ethical Challenges. Lanham, MD: Rowman & Littlefield Publishers. ISBN 978-0-7425-4643-1.
- Schadé, Johannes P. (2006). Encyclopedia of World Religions. Foreign Media Group. ISBN 978-1-60136-000-7.
- Schaff, Philip; Schaff, David Schley (1910). History of the Christian church. Vol. 2 (9th ed.). New York: Charles Scribner's Sons.
- Teja, Ramon (15 September 2006). "El poder de la iglesia imperial : El mito de constantino y el papado romano". Stud, Hist., Ha Antig. 24: 63–81. ISSN 0213-2052.
- Vasiliev, A.A. (1964). History of the Byzantine Empire. University of Wisconsin Press.
- Wordsworth, Christopher (1887). A church history. Vol. 1 (3rd ed.). New York: James Pott and Co.
