= Roman Catholic Archdiocese of Nazianzus =

Catholic archdiocese

Archdiocese of Nazianzus

Location
- Territory: Nazianzus

The Roman Catholic Archdiocese of Nazianzus is a titular see of the Catholic Church. Both Western Catholic and the Eastern Catholic bishops have been assigned to this diocese. The most famous of which being Saint Gregory of Nazianzus.

== Past and present ordinaries ==
- Saint Gregory of Nazianzus - (374 Appointed - 375 Resigned)
- Marcus (Avunculus) Vetter - (1546 Appointed - Nov 1554 Died)
- Girolamo Ragazzoni - (15 Jan 1561 Appointed -)
- Francesco Maria Enrici - (1574 Appointed - 29 Nov 1577 Appointed, Bishop of Senigallia)
- Etienne (Karl) Weinberger, O.F.M. - (27 Jan 1620 Appointed - 1625 Died)
- Charles-Maurice Le Tellier - (3 Sep 1668 Appointed - 3 Aug 1671 Succeeded, Archbishop of Reims)
- Giuseppe Mosti - (16 Dec 1675 Appointed - 29 Jul 1692 Died)
- Alessandro Bonaventura - (23 Feb 1711 Appointed - 7 Feb 1721 Died)
- Niccolò Maria Lercari - (12 Jun 1724 Appointed - 16 Dec 1726 Installed, Cardinal-Priest of Santi Giovanni e Paolo)
- Giovanni Minotto Ottoboni - (16 Dec 1726 Appointed - 8 Feb 1730 Appointed Bishop of Padua)
- Marcello Passari (5 Mar 1731 Appointed - 2 Dec 1733 Installed, Cardinal-Priest of Santa Maria in Ara Coeli)
- Marcello Crescenzi (14 Jul 1739 Appointed - 16 Dec 1743 Installed, Cardinal-Priest of Santa Maria in Traspontina)
- Enrico Enríquez - (16 Dec 1743 Appointed - 22 Jul 1754 Installed, Cardinal-Priest of Sant’Eusebio)
- Giovanni Maria Benzoni - (11 Sep 1754 Appointed - 8 Jan 1757 Died)
- Giovanni Battista Bortoli - (28 Mar 1757 Appointed - 14 Mar 1776 Died)
- Ottavio Boni - (18 Jul 1783 Appointed - 3 Mar 1808 Died)
- Michele Belli - (26 Sep 1814 Appointed - 3 Mar 1822 Died)
- Giacomo Filippo Fransoni - (27 Sep 1822 Appointed - 23 Jun 1828 Appointed, Cardinal-Priest of Santa Maria in Ara Coeli)
- Giacomo Luigi Brignole - (15 Mar 1830 Appointed - 23 Jun 1834 Appointed, Cardinal-Priest of San Giovanni a Porta Latina)
- Antonio Maria Traversi - (11 Jul 1836 Appointed - 21 Feb 1839 Appointed, Titular Patriarch of Constantinople)
- Giovanni Battista de Albertis - (17 Dec 1840 Appointed - 4 Jan 1862 Died)
- Josyf Sembratowicz - (24 Mar 1865 Appointed - 27 Jun 1870 Confirmed, Archbishop of Lviv (Ukrainian))
- Roger William Bede Vaughan, O.S.B. - (28 Feb 1873 Appointed - 16 Mar 1877 Succeeded, Archbishop of Sydney)
- Angelo Di Pietro - (28 Dec 1877 Appointed - 15 Jun 1893 Appointed, Cardinal-Priest of Santi Bonifacio ed Alessio)
- Beniamino Cavicchioni - (11 Jan 1894 Appointed - 25 Jun 1903 Appointed, Cardinal-Priest of Santa Maria in Ara Coeli)
- Angelo Maria Dolci - (9 Dec 1906 Appointed - 27 Jan 1911 Appointed, Archbishop of Amalfi)
- Dionysius Antonius Schüler, O.F.M. - (27 Oct 1911 Appointed - 7 Sep 1926 Died)
- Agostino Mancinelli - (30 Jun 1931 Appointed - 5 Dec 1933 Succeeded, Bishop of Aquino, Sora, e Pontecorvo)
- Bernardo Bertoglio - (3 Feb 1934 Appointed - 15 Feb 1937 Appointed, Bishop of Bobbio (Abbey of San Colombano))
- Salvatore Rotolo, S.D.B. - (5 Oct 1937 Appointed - 20 Oct 1969 Died)
- Demetrius Martin Greschuk - (27 Jun 1974 Appointed - 28 Apr 1986 Appointed, Bishop of Edmonton (Ukrainian))
- Miguel Mykycej, F.D.P. (23 Jun 1990 Appointed - 24 Apr 1999 Appointed, Bishop of Santa María del Patrocinio en Buenos Aires (Ukrainian))
