= D'Andrea =

D’Andrea or d’Andrea (Italian pronunciation: [ˌdanˈdrɛa]) is an Italian surname, literally meaning "Andrew's", "of Andrew" (it is cognate with the surname Anderson). It may refer to:

- Bettina d'Andrea (died 1335), Italian lawyer and professor
- Francesco D'Andrea (1625–1698), Italian jurist and natural philosopher
- Franco D'Andrea (born 1941), Italian jazz and rock pianist
- Gerolamo Marquese d' Andrea (1812–1868), Italian cardinal
- Giovanni d'Andrea (1275–1384), Italian expert in canon law
- John D'Andrea (contemporary), American television music composer and arranger
- Marcelo D'Andrea (contemporary), Argentine film actor
- Novella d'Andrea (died 1333), Italian lawyer and professor
- Oscar d'Andrea (contemporary), Italian champion bobsledder
- Oswald d'Andréa (1934–2024), French composer
- Robert D'Andrea (1933–2025), American politician

== See also ==
- DeAndrea
- D'Andrea Walker, American public administrator and government official
