= Gregory of Nazianzus =

Archbishop of Constantinople from 379 to 381

Saint Gregory of Nazianzus
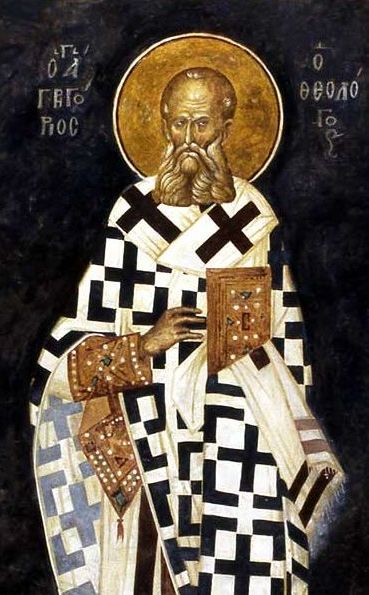
- Fresco from The Chora, 14th cent.

Theologian; Doctor of the Church; Great Hierarch; Cappadocian Father; Ecumenical Teacher
- Born: c. 329; Arianzus, Cappadocia, Roman Empire
- Died: 25 January 390 (aged c. 61); Arianzus, Cappadocia, Roman Empire
- Venerated in: Church of the East; Eastern Orthodox Church; Eastern Catholic Churches; Catholic Church; Oriental Orthodoxy; Anglican Communion; Lutheranism
- Canonized: Pre-Congregation
- Major shrine: Patriarchal Cathedral of St. George in the Fanar
- Feast: Catholic Church: General Roman Calendar: 2 January; General Roman Calendar of 1960: 9 May; Eastern Catholic and Orthodox Churches: 25 January (primary feast day); 30 January (Three Great Hierarchs); Anglican Communion: 2 January; Lutheran Church: 10 January (LCMS); 14 June (ELCA); Armenian Apostolic Church: Saturday before the fourth Sunday of the Transfiguration or Saturday before the third Sunday of the Nativity
- Attributes: Vested as a bishop, wearing an omophorion; holding a Gospel Book or scroll. Iconographically, he is depicted as balding with a bushy white beard.
- Theological work
- Era: Patristic age
- Language: Greek language
- Tradition or movement: Nicene Christianity; cataphatic theology; pneumatology
- Notable ideas: Trinity; Homoousia; consubstantiality; theosis; hypostasis

Gregory of Nazianzus (Koine Greek: Γρηγόριος ὁ Ναζιανζηνός, romanized: Grēgórios ho Nazianzēnós, IPA: [ɣriˈɣori.os o nazi.anziˈnos]; c. 329 – 25 January 390), also known as Saint Gregory the Theologian or Gregory Nazianzen, was an early Roman Christian theologian and prelate who served as Archbishop of Constantinople from 380 to 381. He is widely considered the most accomplished rhetorical stylist of the patristic age. As a classically trained orator and philosopher, he infused Hellenism into the early Church, establishing the paradigm of Byzantine theologians and church officials.

Gregory made a significant impact on the shape of Trinitarian theology among both Greek and Latin-speaking theologians, and he is remembered as the "Trinitarian Theologian". Much of his theological work continues to influence modern theologians, especially in regard to the relationship among the three Persons of the Trinity. Along with the brothers Basil of Caesarea and Gregory of Nyssa, he is known as one of the Cappadocian Fathers.

Gregory of Nazianzus is a saint in both Eastern and Western Christianity. In the Catholic Church he is numbered among the Doctors of the Church; in the Eastern Orthodox Church and the Eastern Catholic Churches he is revered as one of the Three Holy Hierarchs, along with Basil of Caesarea and John Chrysostom. Along with them and Athanasius of Alexandria he is also regarded by the Catholic Church as one of the four Great Greek Church Fathers.

He is also one of only three men in the life of the Orthodox Church who have been officially designated "Theologian" by epithet, the other two being John the Apostle, and Symeon the New Theologian.

== Biography ==
=== Early life and education ===
Gregory was born to Greek parents in the family estate of Karbala outside the village of Arianzus, near Nazianzus, in southwest Cappadocia. His parents, Gregory of Nazianzus the Elder and Nonna of Nazianzus, were wealthy land-owners. In 325, Nonna converted her husband, a Hypsistarian, to Christianity; he was subsequently ordained as bishop of Nazianzus in 328 or 329. The young Gregory and his brother, Caesarius of Nazianzus, first studied at home with their uncle Amphylokhios. Gregory went on to study advanced rhetoric and philosophy in Nazianzus, Caesarea, Alexandria, and Athens. On the way to Athens, his ship encountered a violent storm, and the terrified Gregory prayed to Christ that if He would deliver him, he would dedicate his life to His service. While at Athens, he developed a close friendship with his fellow student Basil of Caesarea, and also made the acquaintance of Flavius Claudius Julianus, who would later become the Roman emperor known as Julian. In Athens, Gregory studied under the famous rhetoricians Himerius and Proaeresius. He may have been baptized there, or shortly after his return to Cappadocia.

=== Priesthood ===
In 361, Gregory returned to Nazianzus and was ordained a presbyter by his father's wish, who wanted him to assist with caring for local Christians. The younger Gregory, who had been considering a monastic existence, resented his father's decision to force him to choose between priestly services and a solitary existence, calling it an "act of tyranny". Leaving home after a few days, he met his friend Basil at Annesoi, where the two lived as ascetics. However, Basil urged him to return home to assist his father, which he did for the next year. Arriving at Nazianzus, Gregory found the local Christian community split by theological differences and his father accused of heresy by local monks. Gregory helped to heal the division through a combination of personal diplomacy and oratory.

By this time, Emperor Julian had publicly declared himself in opposition to Christianity. In response to the emperor's rejection of the Christian faith, Gregory composed his Invectives Against Julian between 362 and 363. Invectives asserts that Christianity will overcome imperfect rulers such as Julian through love and patience. This process as described by Gregory is the public manifestation of the process of deification (theosis), which leads to a spiritual elevation and mystical union with God. Julian resolved, in late 362, to vigorously prosecute Gregory and his other Christian critics; however, the emperor perished the following year during a campaign against the Persians. With the death of the emperor, Gregory and the Eastern churches were no longer under the threat of persecution, as the new Roman emperor Jovian was an avowed Christian and supporter of the church.

Gregory spent the next few years combating Arianism, which threatened to divide the region of Cappadocia. In this tense environment, Gregory interceded on behalf of his friend Basil with Bishop Eusebius (Mazaca). The two friends then entered a period of close fraternal cooperation as they participated in a great rhetorical contest of the Caesarean church precipitated by the arrival of accomplished Arian theologians and rhetors. In the subsequent public debates, presided over by agents of the Emperor Valens, Gregory and Basil emerged triumphant. This success confirmed for both Gregory and Basil that their futures lay in administration of the Church. Basil, who had long displayed inclinations to the episcopacy, was elected bishop of the see of Caesarea in Cappadocia in 370.

=== Episcopate in Sasima and Nazianzus ===
Gregory was ordained Bishop of Sasima in 372 by Basil. Basil created this see in order to strengthen his position in his dispute with Anthimus, bishop of Tyana. The ambitions of Gregory's father to have his son rise in the Church hierarchy and the insistence of his friend Basil convinced Gregory to accept this position despite his reservations. Gregory would later refer to his episcopal ordination as forced upon him by his strong-willed father and Basil. Describing his new bishopric, Gregory lamented how it was nothing more than an "utterly dreadful, pokey little hole; a paltry horse-stop on the main road... devoid of water, vegetation, or the company of gentlemen... this was my Church of Sasima!" He made little effort to administer his new diocese, complaining to Basil that he preferred instead to pursue a contemplative life.

By late 372, Gregory returned to Nazianzus to assist his dying father with the administration of his diocese. This strained his relationship with Basil, who insisted that Gregory resume his post at Sasima. Gregory retorted that he had no intention to continue to play the role of pawn to advance Basil's interests. He instead focused his attention on his new duties as coadjutor of Nazianzus.

It was around this time that his sister, Saint Gorgonia, died, and he preached a eulogy at her funeral.

Following the deaths of his mother and father in 374, Gregory continued to administer the Diocese of Nazianzus but refused to be named bishop. Donating most of his inheritance to the needy, he lived an austere existence. At the end of 375, he withdrew to a monastery at Seleukia, living there for three years. Near the end of this period, his friend Basil died. Although Gregory's health did not permit him to attend the funeral, he wrote a heartfelt letter of condolence to Basil's brother, Gregory of Nyssa, and composed twelve memorial poems dedicated to the memory of his departed friend. (The Greek Anthology, book I epigram 86 and book VIII epigrams 2–11).

=== Gregory at Constantinople ===
Upon the death of Emperor Valens in 378, the accession of Theodosius I, a steadfast supporter of Nicene orthodoxy, was good news to those who wished to purge Constantinople of Arian and Apollinarian domination. The exiled Nicene party gradually returned to the city. From his deathbed, Basil reminded them of Gregory's capabilities and likely recommended his friend to champion the Trinitarian cause in Constantinople.

In 379, the Antioch synod and its archbishop, Meletius, asked Gregory to go to Constantinople to lead a theological campaign to win over that city to Nicene orthodoxy. After much hesitation, Gregory agreed. His cousin Theodosia offered him a villa for his residence; Gregory immediately transformed much of it into a church, naming it Anastasia, "a scene for the resurrection of the faith". From this little chapel he delivered five powerful discourses on Nicene doctrine, explaining the nature of the Trinity and the unity of the Godhead. Refuting the Eunomian denial of the Holy Spirit's divinity, Gregory offered this argument:

Look at these facts: Christ is born, the Holy Spirit is His Forerunner. Christ is baptized, the Spirit bears witness to this ... Christ works miracles, the Spirit accompanies them. Christ ascends, the Spirit takes His place. What great things are there in the idea of God which are not in His power? What titles appertaining to God do not apply also to Him, except for Unbegotten and Begotten? I tremble when I think of such an abundance of titles, and how many Names they blaspheme, those who revolt against the Spirit!

Gregory's homilies were well received and attracted ever-growing crowds to Anastasia. Fearing his popularity, his opponents decided to strike. On the vigil of Easter in 379, an Arian mob burst into his church during worship services, wounding Gregory and killing another bishop. Escaping the mob, Gregory next found himself betrayed by his erstwhile friend, the philosopher Maximus I of Constantinople. Maximus I, who was in secret alliance with Peter II of Alexandria, attempted to seize Gregory's position and have himself ordained bishop of Constantinople. Shocked, Gregory decided to resign his office, but the faction faithful to him induced him to stay and ejected Maximus I. This episode left Gregory embarrassed, and exposed him to criticism as a provincial simpleton unable to cope with the intrigues of the imperial city.

Affairs in Constantinople remained confused as Gregory's position was still unofficial, and Arian priests yet occupied many important churches. The arrival of the emperor Theodosius in 380 settled matters in Gregory's favor. The emperor, determined to eliminate Arianism, expelled Demophilus of Constantinople. Gregory was subsequently enthroned as bishop of Constantinople at the Basilica of the Apostles, replacing Demophilus.

=== Second Ecumenical Council and retirement to Nazianzus ===
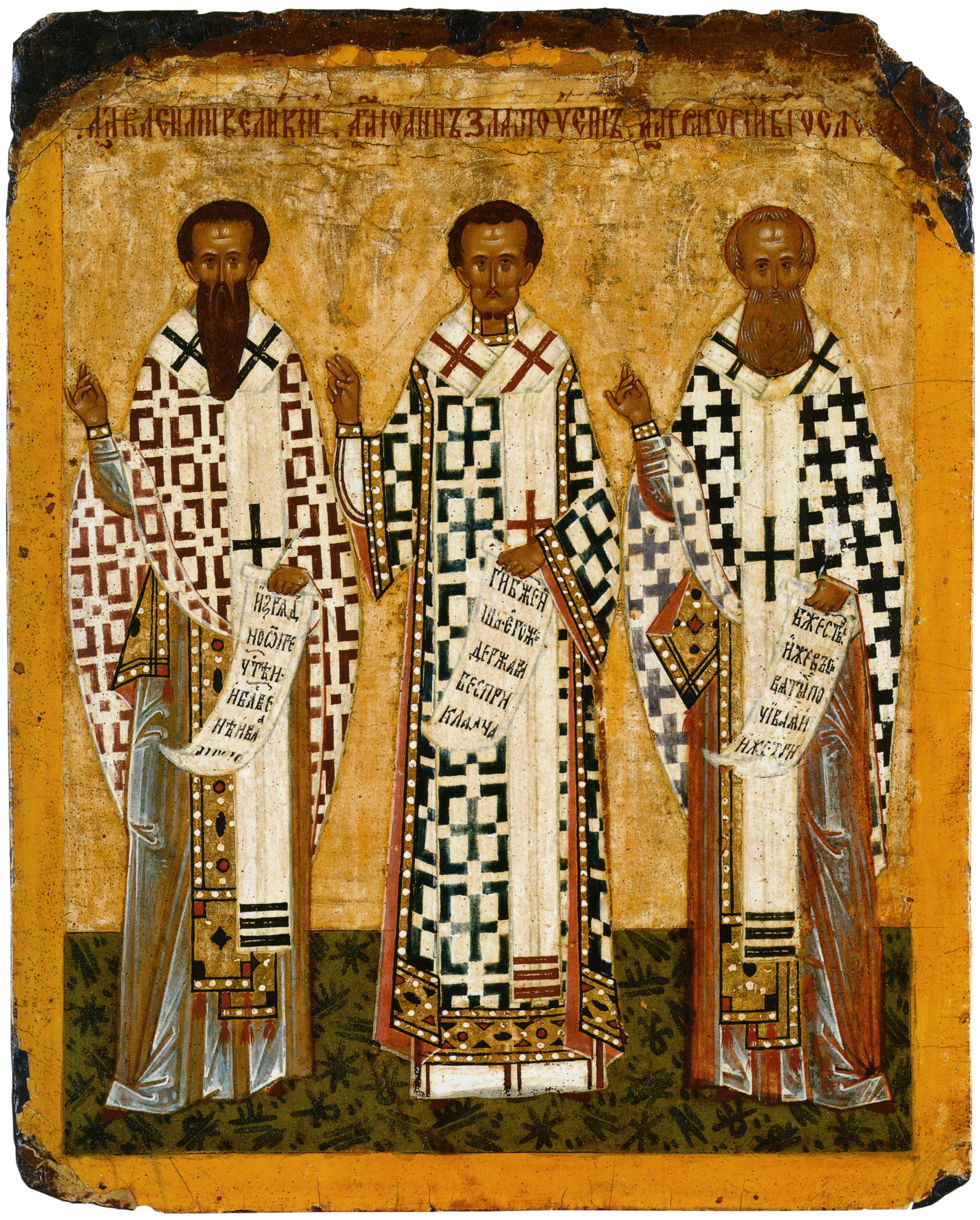
Gregory of Nazianzus with John Chrysostom and Basil of Caesarea on a late-15th-century icon of the Three Holy Hierarchs from the Cathedral of St Sophia, Novgorod

Theodosius wanted to further unify the entire empire behind the orthodox position and decided to convene a church council to resolve matters of faith and discipline. Gregory was of similar mind in wishing to unify Christianity. In the spring of 381, they convened the First Council of Constantinople, which was attended by 150 Eastern bishops. After the death of the presiding bishop, Meletius of Antioch, Gregory was selected to lead the council. Hoping to reconcile the West with the East, he offered to recognize Paulinus II as Patriarch of Antioch. The Egyptian and Macedonian bishops who had supported Maximus's ordination arrived late for the council. Once there, they refused to recognise Gregory's position as head of the church of Constantinople, arguing that his transfer from the See of Sasima was canonically illegitimate.

Gregory was physically exhausted and worried that he was losing the confidence of the bishops and the emperor. Rather than press his case and risk further division, he decided to resign his office: "Let me be as the Prophet Jonah! I was responsible for the storm, but I would sacrifice myself for the salvation of the ship. Seize me and throw me ... I was not happy when I ascended the throne, and gladly would I descend it". He shocked the council with his surprise resignation and then delivered a dramatic speech to Theodosius asking to be released from his offices. The emperor, moved by his words, applauded, commended his labor, and granted his resignation. The Council asked him to appear once more for a farewell ritual and celebratory orations. Gregory used this occasion to deliver a final address (Or. 42) and then departed.

Returning to his homeland of Cappadocia, Gregory once again resumed his position as bishop of Nazianzus. He spent the next year combating the local Apollinarian heretics and struggling with periodic illness. He also began composing De Vita Sua, his autobiographical poem. By the end of 383 he found his health too feeble to cope with episcopal duties. Gregory established Eulalius as bishop of Nazianzus and then withdrew into the solitude of Arianzus. After enjoying six peaceful years in retirement at his family estate, he died on 25 January 390.

Gregory faced stark choices throughout his life: Should he pursue studies as a rhetor or philosopher? Would a monastic life be more appropriate than public ministry? Was it better to blaze his own path or follow the course mapped for him by his father and Basil? Gregory's writings illuminate the conflicts which both tormented and motivated him. Biographers suggest that it was this dialectic which defined him, forged his character, and inspired his search for meaning and truth.

== Legacy ==
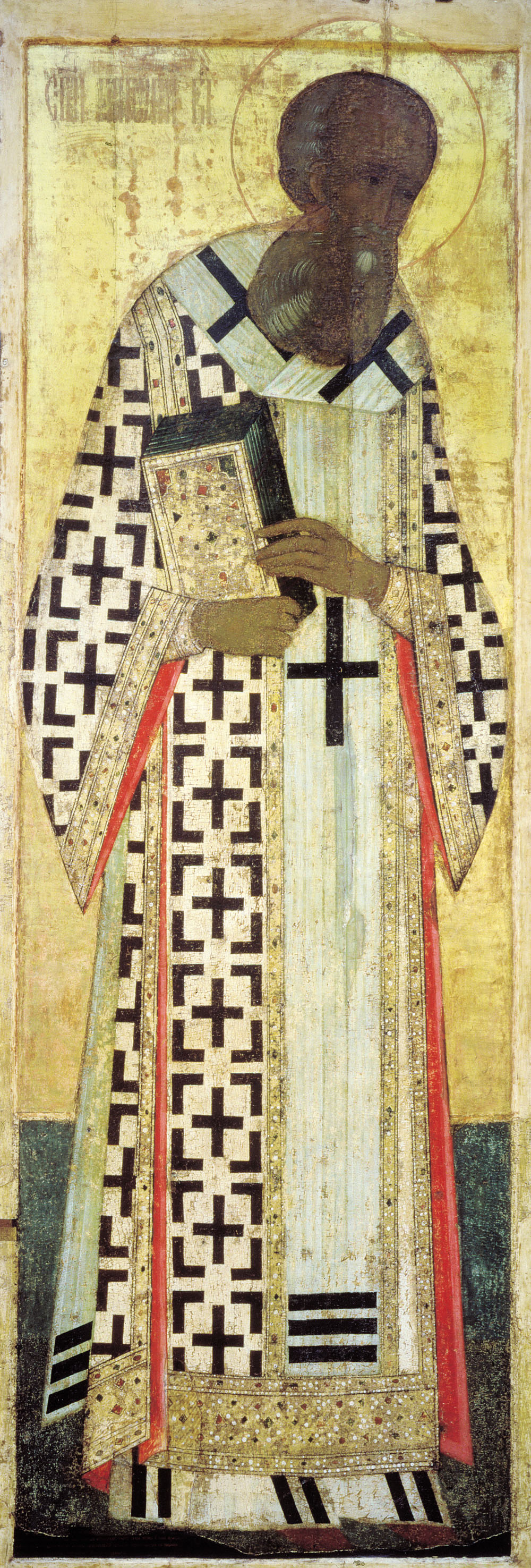
Andrei Rublev, Gregory of Nazianzus, (1408), Dormition Cathedral, Vladimir.

=== Theological and other works ===
Gregory's most significant theological contributions arose from his defense of the doctrine of the Trinity. He is especially noted for his contributions to the field of pneumatology — that is, theology concerning the nature of the Holy Spirit. In this regard, Gregory is the first to use the idea of procession to describe the relationship between the Spirit and the Godhead: "The Holy Spirit is truly Spirit, coming forth from the Father indeed but not after the manner of the Son, for it is not by generation but by procession, since I must coin a word for the sake of clearness." Although Gregory does not fully develop the concept, the idea of procession would shape most later thought about the Holy Spirit.

He emphasized that Jesus did not cease to be God when he became a man, nor did he lose any of his divine attributes when he took on human nature. Furthermore, Gregory asserted that Christ was fully human, including a full human soul. He also proclaimed the eternality of the Holy Spirit, saying that the Holy Spirit's actions were somewhat hidden in the Old Testament but much clearer since the ascension of Jesus into Heaven and the descent of the Holy Spirit at the feast of Pentecost.

In contrast to the Neo-Arian belief that the Son is anomoios, or "unlike" the Father, and with the Semi-Arian assertion that the Son is homoiousios, or "like" the Father, Gregory and his fellow Cappadocians maintained the Nicaean doctrine of homoousia, or consubstantiality of the Son with the Father. The Cappadocian Fathers asserted that God's nature is unknowable to man; helped to develop the framework of hypostases, or three persons united in a single Godhead; illustrated how Jesus is the eikon of the Father; and explained the concept of theosis, the belief that all Christians can be assimilated with God in "imitation of the incarnate Son as the divine model".

Apart from the several theological discourses, Gregory was also one of the most important early Christian men of letters, a very accomplished orator, even perhaps one of the greatest of his time. Gregory was also a very prolific poet who wrote theological, moral, and biographical poems. The book VIII of the Greek Anthology contains exclusively 254 epigrams of his.

=== Influence ===
Gregory's great nephew Nichobulos served as his literary executor, preserving and editing many of his writings. A cousin, Eulalios, published several of Gregory's more noteworthy works in 391. By 400, Rufinius began translating his orations into Latin. As Gregory's works circulated throughout the empire they influenced theological thought. His orations were cited as authoritative by the Council of Ephesus in 431. By 451 he was designated Theologus, or Theologian by the Council of Chalcedon – a title held by no others save John the Apostle and Symeon the New Theologian (949–1022). He is widely quoted by Eastern Orthodox theologians and highly regarded as a defender of the Christian faith. His contributions to Trinitarian theology are also influential and often cited in the Western churches. Paul Tillich credits Gregory of Nazianzus for having "created the definitive formulae for the doctrine of the trinity". Additionally, the Liturgy of Saint Gregory the Theologian in use by the Coptic Church is named after him.

=== Relics ===
Following his death, Gregory was buried at Nazianzus. His relics, consisting of portions of his body and clothing, were transferred to Constantinople in 950, into the Church of the Holy Apostles. Part of the relics were taken from Constantinople by Crusaders during the Fourth Crusade, in 1204, and ended up in Rome. On 27 November 2004, those relics, along with those of John Chrysostom, were returned to Istanbul by Pope John Paul II, with the Vatican retaining a small portion of both. The relics are now enshrined in the Patriarchal St. George's Cathedral, Istanbul in the Fanar.

=== Death ===
During the six years of life which remained to him after his final retirement to his birthplace, Gregory composed the greater part of his copious poetical works. These include a valuable autobiographical poem of nearly 2000 lines; about one hundred other shorter poems relating to his past career; and a large number of epitaphs, epigrams, and epistles to well-known people during that era. The poems that he wrote that dealt with his personal affairs refer to the continuous illness and severe sufferings (physical and spiritual) which assailed him during his last years. In the tiny plot of ground at Arianzus, all that remained to him of his rich inheritance was by a fountain near which there was a shady walk. Gregory retired here to spend his days as a hermit. It was during this time that he decided to write theological discourses and poetry of both a religious and an autobiographical nature. He would receive occasional visits from intimate friends, as well as visits from strangers who were attracted to his retreat by his large reputation for sanctity and learning. He died about 25 January 390, although the exact date of his death is unknown.

== Feast days ==
Gregory of Nazianzus is celebrated on different days across Christianity:

- 2 January: The Catholic Church and the Church of England celebrate Gregory's feast on 2 January;
- 10 January: The Lutheran Church – Missouri Synod commemorates Gregory, along with Basil of Caesarea and Gregory of Nyssa (the Cappadocian Fathers) on 10 January;
- 19, 25 and 30 January: The Eastern Orthodox Church and the Eastern Catholic Churches celebrate two major feast days in Gregory's honor. 25 January is his primary feast; 30 January, known as the feast of the Three Great Hierarchs, commemorates him along with John Chrysostom and Basil of Caesarea. There is also a minor feast day on 19 January which commemorates the transfer of his relics;
- 9 May: The Episcopal Church celebrates Gregory's feast on 9 May;
- 14 June: The Evangelical Lutheran Church in America commemorates Gregory of Nazianzus together with his friends Basil the Great and Gregory of Nyssa on 14 June;
- Armenian Dates: The Armenian Apostolic Church devotes two days each year to Gregory. He is commemorated together with eleven other doctors of the Church on the Saturday before the feast of the Discovery of the Holy Cross (which is observed on the Sunday closest to 26 October. The Armenian Church calendar also has a feast day dedicated solely to Gregory. This falls either on the Saturday before the fourth Sunday of the Transfiguration, or if that day falls during the feast of the Assumption, on the Saturday before the third Sunday after the Nativity.

== See also ==
- List of Ecumenical Patriarchs of Constantinople
- Ecumenical Patriarch of Constantinople

== Bibliography ==
- Børtnes, Jostein; Hägg, Tomas (2006), Gregory of Nazianzus - Images and Reflections, Copenhagen: Museum Tusculanum Press, ISBN 978-87-635-0386-0.
- Herbermann, Charles, ed. (1913). "St. Gregory of Nazianzus" . Catholic Encyclopedia. New York: Robert Appleton Company.
- John Anthony McGuckin, St. Gregory of Nazianzus - An Intellectual Biography, Crestwood, NY, 2001, St. Vladimir's Seminar Press, ISBN 0-88141-222-8.
- Jacques Paul Migne (General Editor), Cursus Completus Patrologiae Graecae, Volumes 35–38, Paris, 1857–1866.
- The Orthodox Church of America website article on St. Gregory the Theologian, Retrieved 2 May 2007.
- Rosemary Radford Ruether, Gregory of Nazianzus, Oxford, 1969, Oxford University Press.
- Turner, H.E.W. and Francis Young, "Procession(s)" in The Westminster Dictionary of Christian Theology, ed. A. Richardson and J. Bowden, Philadelphia, 1983, Westminster Press, 1983.
- Underwood, Paul Atkins (1966). The Kariye Djami. Vol. 1. Bollingen Foundation. LCCN 65-10404.
- Gregory of Nazianzus, translated by Martha Vinson, Select Orations, Catholic University of America Press, 2003, Link.

Titles of the Great Christian Church
Preceded by Evagrius	Archbishop of Constantinople; Disputed by Maximus I 380 – 381	Succeeded by Nectarius
