= 375 =

375 in various calendars
- Gregorian calendar: 375; CCCLXXV
- Ab urbe condita: 1128
- Assyrian calendar: 5125
- Balinese saka calendar: 296–297
- Bengali calendar: −219 – −218
- Berber calendar: 1325
- Buddhist calendar: 919
- Burmese calendar: −263
- Byzantine calendar: 5883–5884
- Chinese calendar: 甲戌年 (Wood Dog); 3072 or 2865 — to — 乙亥年 (Wood Pig); 3073 or 2866
- Coptic calendar: 91–92
- Discordian calendar: 1541
- Ethiopian calendar: 367–368
- Hebrew calendar: 4135–4136
- Hindu calendars
- Vikram Samvat: 431–432
- Shaka Samvat: 296–297
- Kali Yuga: 3475–3476
- Holocene calendar: 10375
- Iranian calendar: 247 BP – 246 BP
- Islamic calendar: 255 BH – 254 BH
- Javanese calendar: 257–258
- Julian calendar: 375; CCCLXXV
- Korean calendar: 2708
- Minguo calendar: 1537 before ROC 民前1537年
- Nanakshahi calendar: −1093
- Seleucid era: 686/687 AG
- Thai solar calendar: 917–918
- Tibetan calendar: ཤིང་ཕོ་ཁྱི་ལོ་ (male Wood-Dog); 501 or 120 or −652 — to — ཤིང་མོ་ཕག་ལོ་ (female Wood-Boar); 502 or 121 or −651

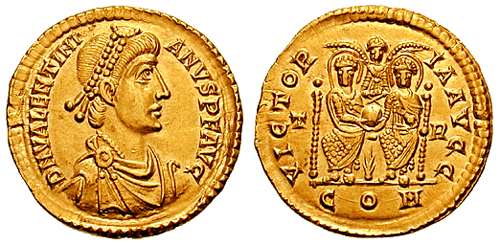
Solidus of Emperor Valentinian II

Year 375 (CCCLXXV) was a common year starting on Thursday of the Julian calendar. At the time, it was known in Rome as the Year after the Consulship of Augustus and Equitius (or, less frequently, year 1128 Ab urbe condita). The denomination 375 for this year has been used since the early medieval period, when the Anno Domini calendar era became the prevalent method in Europe for naming years.

== Events ==
=== By place ===
==== Roman Empire ====
- November 17 – Emperor Valentinian I concludes an enduring peace with the Alamanni in Germany, then marches into Illyricum to repel an invasion of the Quadi and the Sarmatians on the Danube frontier. While negotiating with the Quadi, Valentinian, age 54, becomes so enraged that he dies in a fit of apoplexy at Brigetio (Hungary). Extreme cruelty has marked his 11-year reign, but he has also founded schools and provided physicians to serve the poor of Constantinople.
- The Quadi accept an uneasy peace from Merobaudes (Magister militum), which gives them land to settle on the Danube.
- Gratian, age 16, takes over the government at Augusta Treverorum (modern Trier), but ministers wishing to retain the loyalty of the Illyrian army fear a usurper. They proclaim Valentinian's 4-year-old son Valentinian II co-emperor with his mother, Justina, as regent. Gratian reserves for himself the administration of the Gallic provinces, and hands over Italy, Illyrium, Hispania and Africa to his stepmother, who makes Mediolanum (Milan) her residence.
- Gratian, advised by his chief advisor Ambrosius, begins a systematic persecution of the pagans. He confiscates the fortunes of the temples and adds the money to the Imperial Treasury. He proscribes Arianism and Donatism.
- In Africa, the dissident Berber prince Firmus is delivered to the Romans by his brother Gildon.

==== India ====
- Emperor Chandragupta II becomes ruler of the Gupta Empire (India). He is the son of Samudragupta the Great and retains his reign by an aggressive expansionist policy.

==== Asia ====
- Geungusu becomes king of the Korean kingdom of Baekje.

=== By topic ===
==== Education ====
- The earliest extant books – a school textbook and an account book – with bound wooden leaves, are lost at the Dakhla Oasis in western Egypt. The desert sands preserve them for modern archaeologists.

==== Religion ====
- The first two Korean Buddhist temples are built.
- Saint Jerome retires to the desert of Chalcis (Syria).
- The Maronite Church is founded by Saint Maron in Lebanon.
- The Talmud of Babylon is written by Rav Ashi. This commentary on the Mishnah contains approximately 2.5 million words on 5.894 pages.

== Births ==
- Orosius, Christian historian and theologian (approximate date)
- Zong Bing (or Shaowen), Chinese artist and musician (d. 443)

== Deaths ==
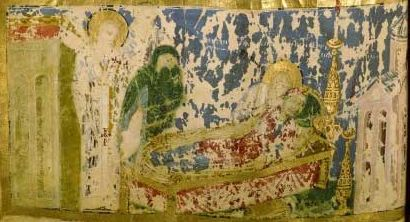
Saint Gorgonia

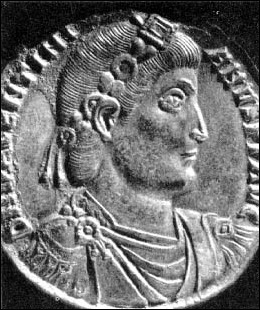
Emperor Valentinian I

- February 23 – Saint Gorgonia, daughter of Gregory the Elder
- May 30 – Emmelia of Caesarea, Byzantine Eastern Orthodox priest
- September 3 – Mansuetus, Christian bishop and saint
- November 17 – Valentinian I, Roman emperor (b. 321)
- Geunchogo (or Chogo II), Korean ruler of Baekje
- Kipunada, Indian ruler of the Kushan Empire
- Pambo (or Pemwah), Coptic Desert Father (b. 305)
- Rav Papa, Babylonian Jewish amora and talmudist
- Samudragupta, Indian emperor of the Gupta Empire
- Wang Meng (or Jinglüe), Chinese politician (b. 325)
