= Saint Gorgonia =

Daughter of Saint Gregory the Elder

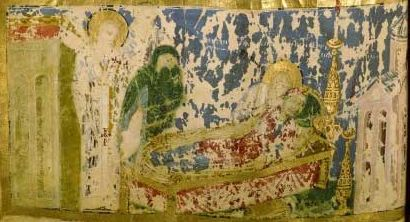
- Born: Nazianzus, Cappadocia (modern-day Nenizi, Gülağaç, Aksaray, Turkey)
- Died: c. 375
- Venerated in: Eastern Orthodox Church; Roman Catholic Church
- Feast: 23 February (Eastern Orthodox Church); 9 December (Roman Catholic Church)
- Patronage: people afflicted by bodily ills or sickness

Saint Gorgonia (Greek: Αγία Γοργονία; died c. 375) was the daughter of Saint Gregory the Elder and Saint Nonna. She is remembered as a saint in both the Eastern Orthodox Church and Roman Catholic Church for her piety as a married woman.

Her husband was named Alypius according to Epitaph. 24 by her brother Saint Gregory of Nazianzus in Greek anthology.

== Biography ==
Gorgonia married a man of some influence in Pisidia, sometimes called Vitolian, and other times, Meletius. By at least one account, she is called the "pattern of a married saint." She had several sons and three daughters, the most notable of whom was named Alypania. Later in her life, she converted her husband, and was baptized along with him and her sons and grandsons.

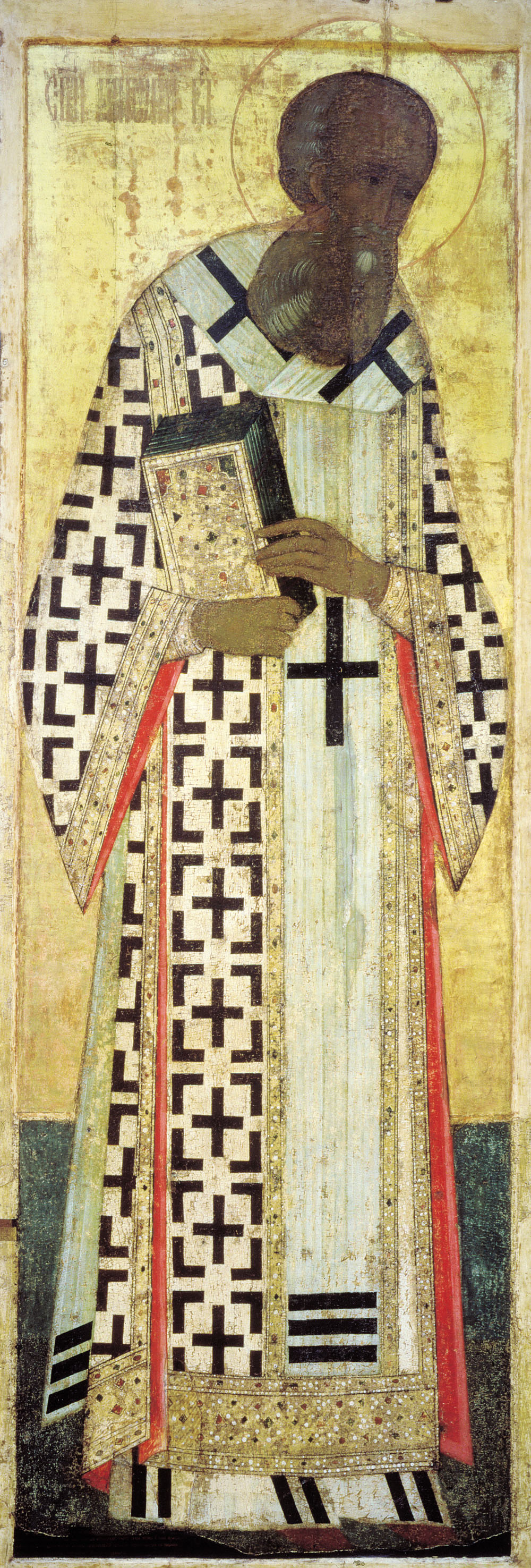
Gregory the Theologian eulogized Saint Gorgonia as "The Diamond of Her Sex"

Two times in her life, she was miraculously cured of serious maladies. The first of these was her having been trampled by a team of mules, causing her broken bones and crushed internal organs. Yet, Gorgonia would have no doctor, as she thought it indecent. According to the legend, it was this modesty which cured her.

Another time, she cured herself of a desperate illness by anointing herself with "the sacred elements of the Eucharist" mixed with her own tears, which she had shed with her head on the altar. She was cured of this disease as she was of the first, the symptoms of headache, fever, paralysis, and sporadic coma disappearing, allegedly, through the strength of her prayer.

Gorgonia died around 375 of natural causes. Her father and mother were alive, though extremely old, at the time of her death. At her funeral, her brother Gregory of Nazianzus the Younger preached a eulogy which declared her a model Christian spouse and mother, as well as "The Paragon of Women" and "The Diamond of Her Sex."

== Veneration ==
Saint Gorgonia is venerated as the patron saint of people afflicted by bodily ills or sickness. The legacy of her charity has earned her the titles "Mother of Orphans", "Eyes of the Blind", and "Keeper of a Refuge of the Poor" in the Greek Orthodox Church. Her feast day on the calendar of saints is 9 December in the West and 23 February in the East, the latter date purported to be that of her death.
