= 370 =

370 in various calendars
Gregorian calendar	370; CCCLXX
Ab urbe condita	1123
Assyrian calendar	5120
Balinese saka calendar	291–292
Bengali calendar	−224 – −223
Berber calendar	1320
Buddhist calendar	914
Burmese calendar	−268
Byzantine calendar	5878–5879
Chinese calendar	己巳年 (Earth Snake); 3067 or 2860 — to — 庚午年 (Metal Horse); 3068 or 2861
Coptic calendar	86–87
Discordian calendar	1536
Ethiopian calendar	362–363
Hebrew calendar	4130–4131
- Hindu calendars
Vikram Samvat	426–427
Shaka Samvat	291–292
Kali Yuga	3470–3471
Holocene calendar	10370
Iranian calendar	252 BP – 251 BP
Islamic calendar	260 BH – 259 BH
Javanese calendar	252–253
Julian calendar	370; CCCLXX
Korean calendar	2703
Minguo calendar	1542 before ROC 民前1542年
Nanakshahi calendar	−1098
Seleucid era	681/682 AG
Thai solar calendar	912–913
Tibetan calendar	ས་མོ་སྦྲུལ་ལོ་ (female Earth-Snake); 496 or 115 or −657 — to — ལྕགས་ཕོ་རྟ་ལོ་ (male Iron-Horse); 497 or 116 or −656

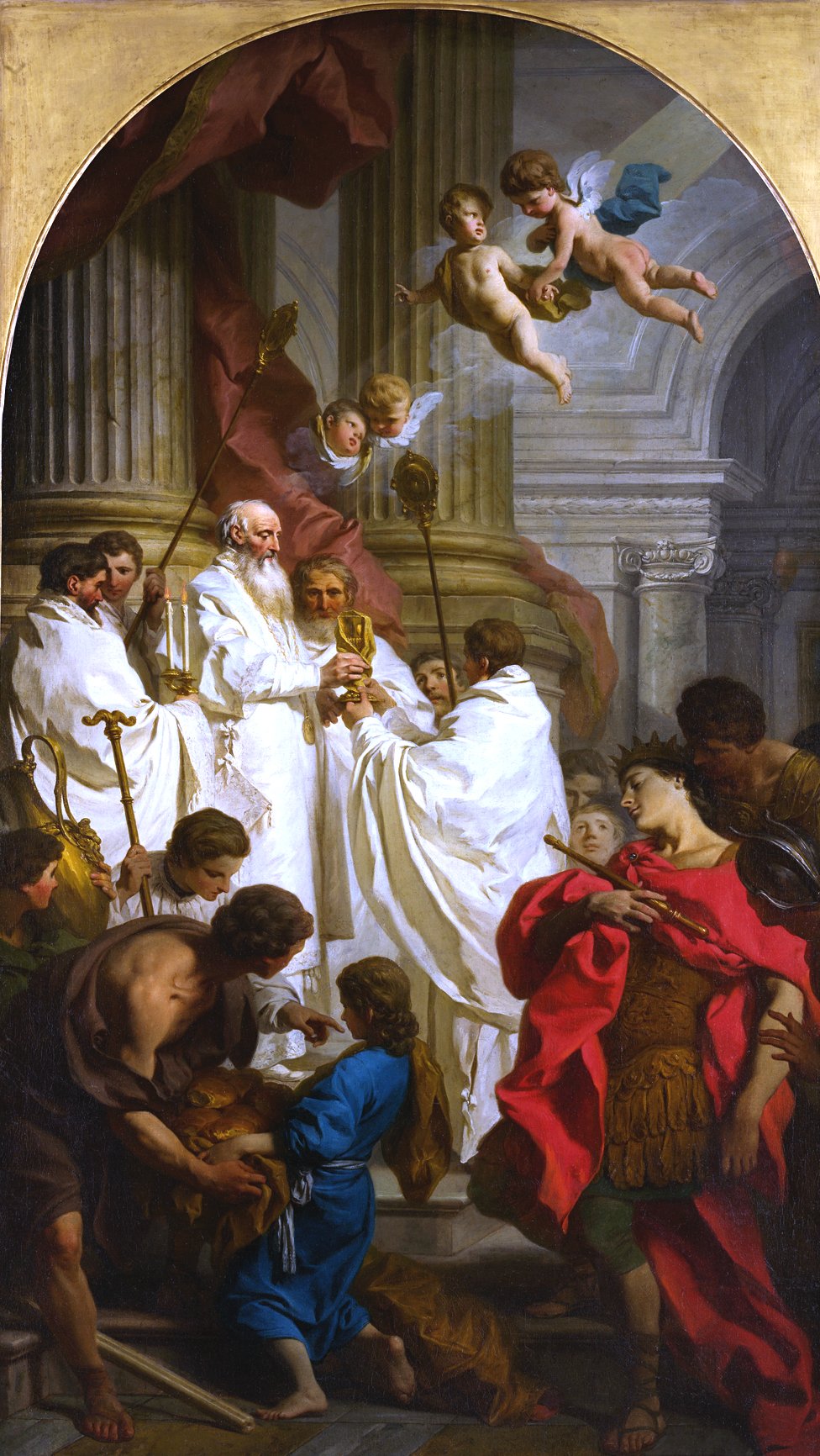
Basil of Caesarea (middle) (330–379)

Year 370 (CCCLXX) was a common year starting on Friday of the Julian calendar. At the time, it was known as the Year of the Consulship of Augustus and Valens (or, less frequently, year 1123 Ab urbe condita). The denomination 370 for this year has been used since the early medieval period, when the Anno Domini calendar era became the prevalent method in Europe for naming years.

== Events ==
=== By place ===
==== Roman Empire ====
- Germanic Invasions: Various Germanic tribes are forced against the northern borders of the Roman Empire as they flee the invading Huns.
- A law of Valentinian I and Valens bans marriages between Romans and barbarians under penalty of death.
- An edict issued by Valentinian I and Valens bans the importation of wine and olive oil from areas controlled by the barbarians.

==== Europe ====
- The Huns migrate westward from the Volga into Europe and subjugate the Alans and the Ostrogoths. With their arrival, a tradition of composite bows is introduced.
- Athanaric, Gothic leader of the Tervingi, advances eastwards and takes up a defensive position along the banks of the Dniester (Romania).

==== Asia ====
- Former Qin conquers Former Yan in China.

=== By topic ===
==== Religion ====
- Basil the Great becomes bishop of Caesarea (Cappadocia).
- Demophilus of Constantinople becomes Patriarch of Constantinople, although his position is disputed by Evagrius of Constantinople.
- John Chrysostom is baptized.

== Births ==
- Alaric I (or Alaricus), king of the Visigoths (d. 410)
- Brice of Tours, Catholic bishop of Tours (d. 444)
- Claudian, Roman poet and writer (d. 404)
- Decimus Rusticus, Roman praetorian prefect
- Hypatia, Greek female philosopher (d. 415)

== Deaths ==
- Deng Xia (or Yingyuan), Chinese general (approximate date)
- Eudoxius of Antioch, Syrian patriarch of Constantinople
- Lucifer Calaritanus, founder of the Luciferian sect (approximate date)
- Pharantzem, Armenian queen and regent (approximate date)
- Strategius Musonianus, Roman politician (approximate date)
- Valentinianus Galates, Roman emperor (approximate date)
- Yuan Zhen (or Yanren), Chinese general and rebel leader
