= Nonna of Nazianzus =

Eastern Orthodox and Roman Catholic saint

Saint Nonna of Nazianzus
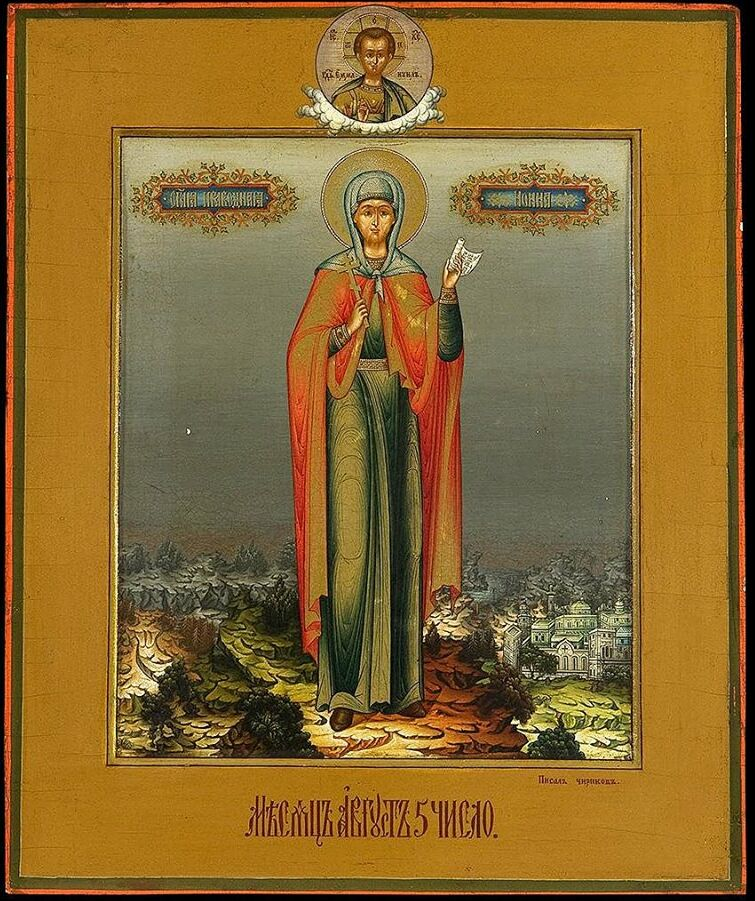

Matron
- Born: c. 305; Nazianzus, Cappadocia (modern-day Nenizi, Aksaray, Turkey)
- Died: 374
- Venerated in: Roman Catholic Church; Eastern Orthodox Church
- Feast: 5 August
- Patronage: death of children, information services

Saint Nonna of Nazianzus (Greek: Νόννα) was the wife of Gregory of Nazianzus the Elder, and the mother of Gregory the Theologian, Caesarius, and Gorgonia. She lived in Cappadocia, a province of the Roman Empire in present-day central Turkey.

== Life ==
After Nonna married, she converted her husband Gregory to Christianity. He had been a member of the Hypsistarians, a Jewish-pagan sect that worshipped Hypsistos, the "Most High" God. She was the mother of three children, each of whom became saints, the most notable of which being Gregory of Nazianzus. She outlived her husband and two of her children, dying in 374.

Her son Gregory tells of an occasion in 351 when Nonna fell sick with a severe illness and appeared to be at the point of death. On his way to visit a friend, Gregory hurried instead to his mother who, in the meantime, had begun to recover. She had a vision in which Gregory had given her miraculous cakes marked with the sign of the cross, and blessed by him.

Gregory championed Nonna as a model of Christian motherhood. He wrote of her,

My mother was a worthy companion for such a man [as my father] and her qualities were as great as his. She came from a pious family, but was even more pious than they. Though in her body she was but a woman, in her spirit she was above all men... Her mouth knew nothing but the truth, but in her modesty she was silent about those deeds which brought her glory. She was guided by the fear of God...

== Bibliography ==
- Jones, Terry. "Nonna". Patron Saints Index. Retrieved 2007-05-06.
- Dunbar, Agnes (1904). A Dictionary of Saintly Women. George Bell & Sons.
