= Cumhuriyet (disambiguation) =

Cumhuriyet means "republic" in Turkish. It may refer to:

- Cumhuriyet, a daily newspaper in Turkey
- Cumhuriyet University, a public university in Sivas Province, Turkey
- Cumhuriyet (The Republic (film)), 1998 Turkish film

== Places ==
- Cumhuriyet, Beşiri
- Cumhuriyet, Çay, a village in the district of Çay, Afyonkarahisar Province, Turkey
- Cumhuriyet, Dinar, a village in the district of Dinar, Afyonkarahisar Province, Turkey
- Cumhuriyet, Gülağaç, a village in the district of Gülağaç, Aksaray Province, Turkey
- Cumhuriyet, Karakoçan
- Cumhuriyet, Kayapınar
- Cumhuriyet, Manyas, a village
