= Cumhuriyet, Saratlı, Gülağaç =

Cumhuriyet
- Neighbourhood
- Location in Turkey Cumhuriyet (Turkey Central Anatolia)
- Coordinates: 38°29′28″N 34°17′52″E
- Country: Turkey
- Province: Aksaray
- District: Gülağaç
- Municipality: Saratlı
- Population (2022): 232
- Time zone: UTC+3 (TRT)

Cumhuriyet is a neighbourhood of the town Saratlı, Gülağaç District, Aksaray Province, Turkey. Before 2013 it was a village in Gülağaç District. Its population is 232 (2022).
