= Saint Caesarius =

Saint Caesarius may refer to:

- Saint Caesarius of Arles (6th-century bishop)
- Saint Caesarius of Nazianzus (4th-century physician)
- Saint Caesarius of Africa, also Saint Caesarius of Terracina (2nd-century martyr)
