= Sasima =

Town in the late Roman province of Cappadocia Secunda

Coordinates: 38°13′47″N 34°37′45″E

Sasima (Ancient Greek: Σάσιμα) was a town of ancient Cappadocia and in the late Roman province of Cappadocia Secunda, located 24 Roman miles to the south of Nazianzus.

Its site is located near Hasanköy, Asiatic Turkey.

== History ==
Sasima is mentioned in only three non-religious documents: "Itiner. Anton.", 144; "Itiner. Hiersol.", 577; Hierocles, 700, 6. The very small town is known for being the first see of St. Gregory of Nazianzus who was appointed to it by his friend St. Basil as an aspect of Basil's conflict with Anthimus. Gregory was there only briefly, if at all. Anthimus, bishop of Tyana, had claimed status as an archbishop and jurisdiction over Sasima after the Emperor Valens divided Cappadocia into two parts. Anthimus appointed a competing claimant bishop for Sasima to whom Gregory effectively ceded the town. All the Greek Notitiae episcopatuum consider Sasima part of Cappadocia Secunda, as does the Annuario Pontificio, making it a suffragan of Tyana.

Ambrose of Sasima signed the letter of the bishops of the province to Byzantine Emperor Leo I the Thracian in 458. About the same time Eleusius appears as an adversary of the Council of Chalcedon.

Towards 1143 Clement was condemned as a Bogomile. The "Notitiae" mention the see until the following century.
