= Çatalsu =

Çatalsu may refer:

- Çatalsu, Gülağaç, a village in Aksaray Province in Turkey
- Çatalsu, Oğuzeli, a village in Gaziantep Province in Turkey
