= Giacomo Luigi Brignole =

Catholic cardinal (1797–1853)

His Eminence Giacomo Luigi Brignole
- Prefect of the Congregation of the Index
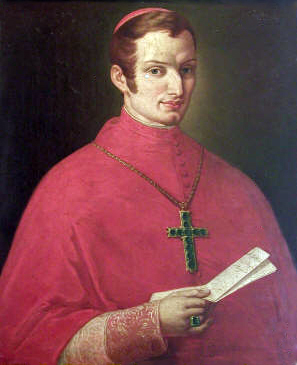
- Portrait.
- Church: Roman Catholic Church
- Appointed: 7 April 1849
- Term ended: 23 June 1853
- Predecessor: Angelo Mai
- Successor: Girolamo D'Andrea
- Other posts: Cardinal-Priest of Santa Cecilia in commendum (1838–53); Cardinal-Bishop of Sabina (1847–53)
- Previous posts: Titular Archbishop of Nazianzus (1830–34); Cardinal-Priest of San Giovanni a Porta Latina in commendum (1834–47); Camerlengo of the College of Cardinals (1851–52)

Orders
- Consecration: 28 March 1830 by Giacomo Filippo Fransoni
- Created cardinal: 20 January 1834 by Pope Gregory XVI
- Rank: Cardinal-Priest (1834–47); Cardinal-Bishop (1847–53)

Personal details
- Born: Giacomo Luigi Brignole; 8 May 1797 Genoa, Republic of Genoa
- Died: 23 June 1853 (aged 56) Rome, Papal States
- Buried: Santa Cecilia in Trastevere
- Education: La Sapienza University

Giacomo Luigi Brignole (8 May 1797 – 23 June 1853) was a Catholic Cardinal and Camerlengo of the Sacred College of Cardinals.

== Early life ==
Brignole was born on 8 May 1797 in Genoa, then the capital of the Republic of Genoa.

He was educated at local institutions in Genoa where he studied humanities and then at the La Sapienza University in Rome where he received a doctorate in utroque iuris (both civil and canon law) in 1835. After being ordained as a priest he was appointed Vice-legate in Ferrara and later Vicar of the patriarchal Lateran Basilica in Rome.

He was elected titular archbishop of Nazianzo in and was consecrated in 1830, Rome, by Cardinal Giacomo Filippo Franzoni and was appointed Treasurer General of the Apostolic Chamber in 1833.

== Cardinalate ==
Brignole was elevated to cardinal-priest in 1834 and was appointed President of the Commission of Subsidies in 1840.

He participated in the Papal Conclave of 1846 which elected Pope Pius IX.

He also held the positions of Prefect of the Sacred Consulta of the Index and President of the Consulta of State. In 1851 he was appointed Camerlengo of the Sacred College of Cardinals, a position he held, as was convention at the time, for a year until 1852.

== Death, burial and funeral ==
Brignole died on 23 June 1853 in Rome. His body was exposed in the basilica of San Lorenzo in Damaso. Pope Pius IX participated in his funeral and he was finally buried, according to his will, in the church of St Cecilia.

Catholic Church titles
Preceded by Mario Mattei	Camerlengo of the Sacred College of Cardinals; 1851–1852	Succeeded by Costantino Patrizi
