= Marie-Éléonore Godefroid =

French artist (1778–1849)

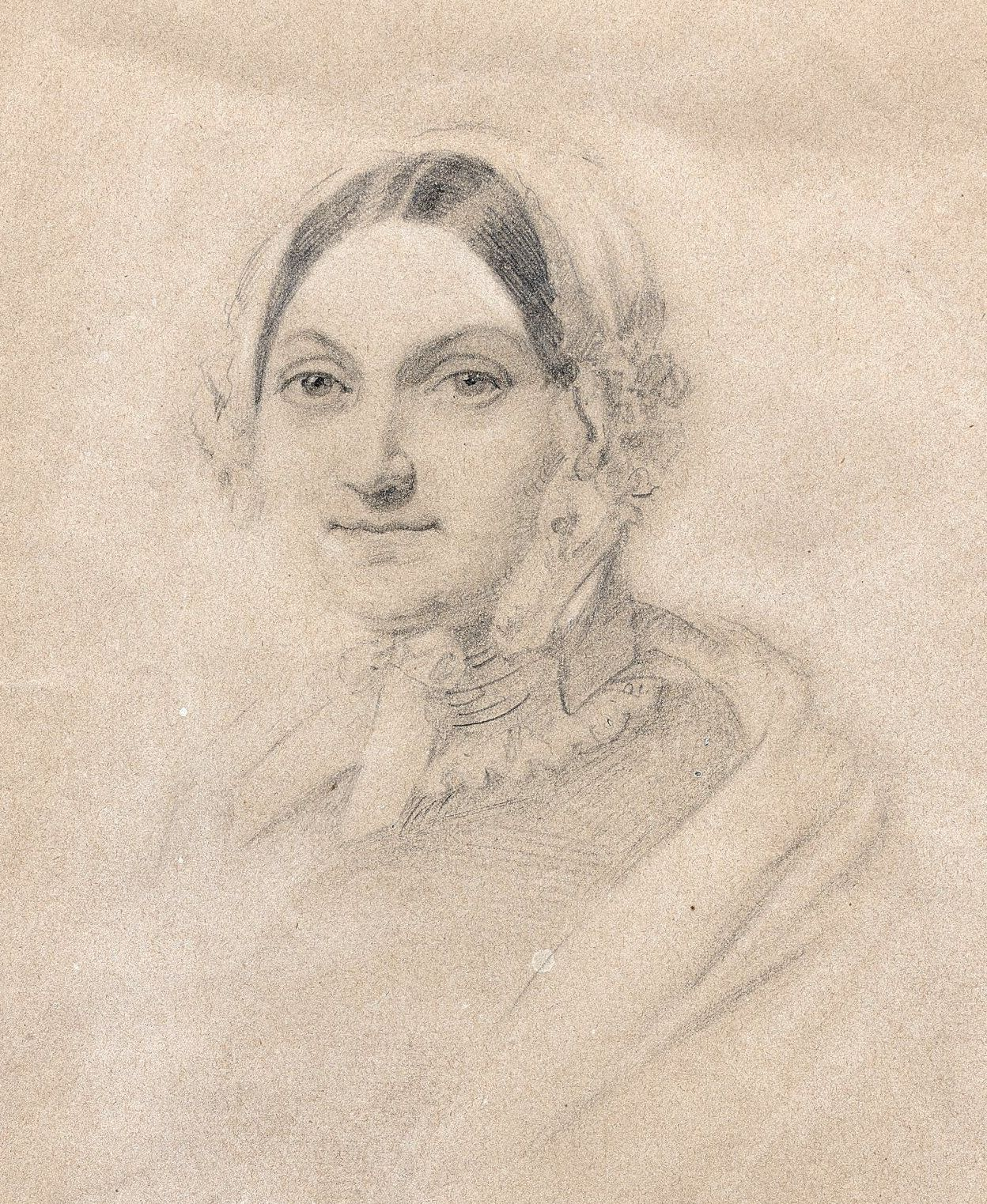
- Portrait by Jules Boilly, 1872
- Born: June 20, 1778; Paris, France
- Died: 1849 (aged 70–71); Paris, France
- Known for: Painting

Marie-Éléonore Godefroid (20 June 1778 – 1849) was a French painter, watercolorist, pastellist, and draughtswoman. Some of her major works include Portraits of the Children of Marshall Duke d'Enghien (1810), Portrait of Queen Hortense with her Children (1812), the Royal Princes, Portrait of the Princesses Louise and Marie d'Orléans, and Portrait of the Prince de Joinville. Godefroid is best known as a portrait painter.

== Biography ==
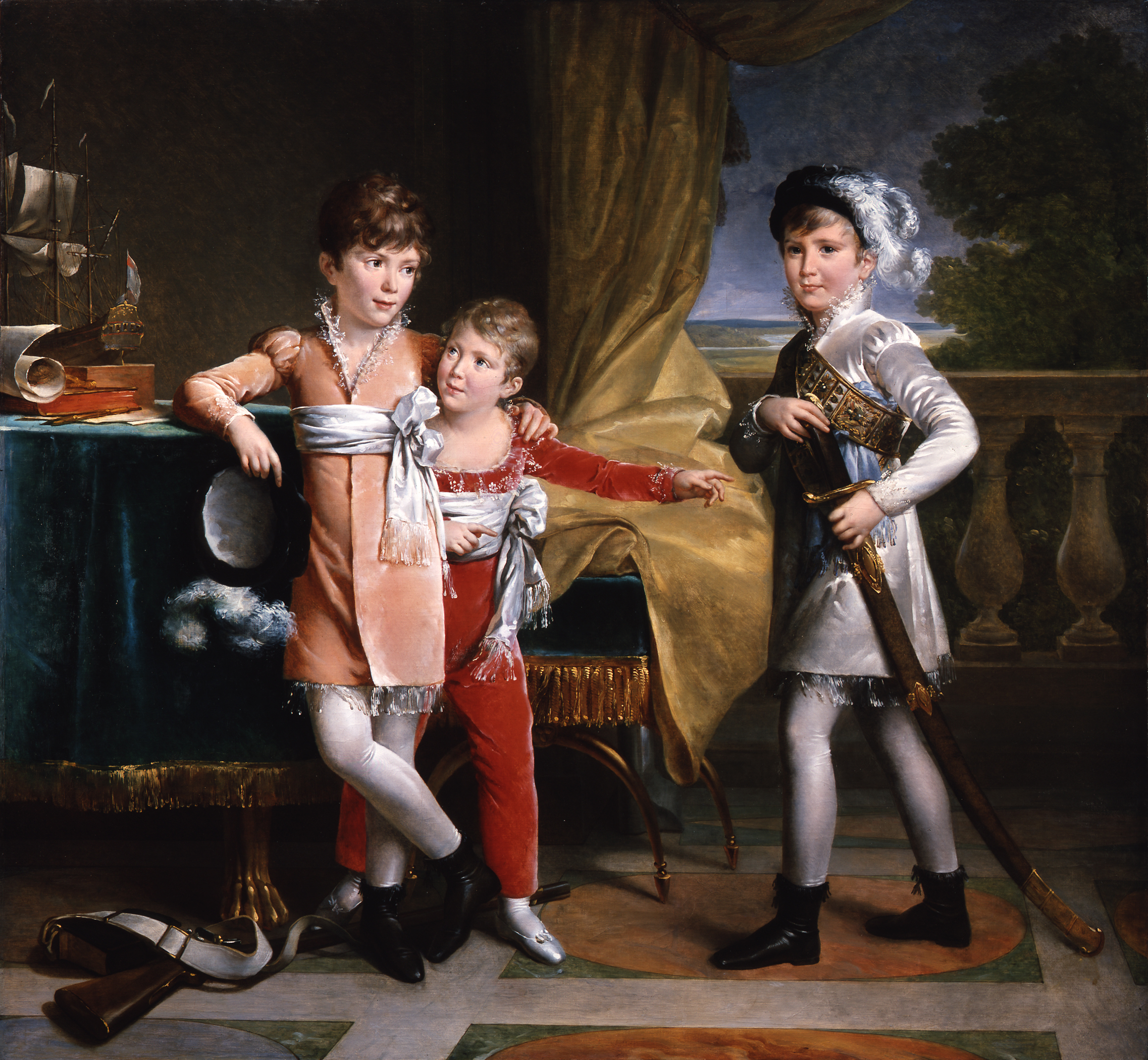
The Sons of Marshal Ney, 1810

Godefroid was born in Paris and was trained in the Davidian style of painting. She first studied art under her father, the royally-appointed art restorer Ferdinand-Joseph Godefroid. She would go on to become an instructor of arts and music at the Institute of Saint-Germain-en-Laye de Jeanne Campan, where young elite women of the Napoleonic period were trained. In 1795, she quit her post, however, to dedicate herself completely to painting.

Around 1805, Godefroid joined the atelier of Baron François Gérard, with whom she would later collaborate. She joined his household by 1812 as an assistant in his office and studio, as well as a companion for him, his wife, and their nephews. Godefroid was also a student of Jean-Baptiste Isabey who worked in oil, aquarelle, and pastels.

Between 1800 and 1847, Godefroid exhibited portraits in nineteen exhibitions at the Paris Salon, winning medals in the Salon of 1812 and Salon of 1824. Notably, in 1810, she exhibited the celebrated Portraits of the Children of Marshall Duke d'Enghien (Portrait en pied des enfans de M.gr le maréchal duc d'Elchingen), a full-length portrait of the children of Marshal Ney. The work depicts Ney's eight-year-old son Joseph Napoléon, second-oldest son Michel Louis, and two-year-old son Eugène in fancy dress.

Some of Godefroid's other exhibited works included portraits of the children of the Duke of Rovigo and Queen Hortense in 1812, portraits of the children of the Duke of Orleans in 1819 and 1822, and portraits of the Duke of Orleans and Monsieur and Madame de Guiche in 1827. She also portrayed other notable figures including Abd el-Kader, the painter Jacques-Louis David, Jeanne Campan, Germaine de Staël, Talleyrand and Marshal Lauriston, among others. She also created several portraits that were not exhibited: the portraits of Mrs. Oudenarde, the Latour Maubourg Countess, violinist Pierre Rode, and Camille Jordan, whose portrait was engraved by Mullier.

Godefroid was one of the many women artists that Empress Joséphine patronized. She also worked as a copyist and reproduced several works for the French government, including the portraits of Louis XVIII and Charles X.

== Image gallery ==
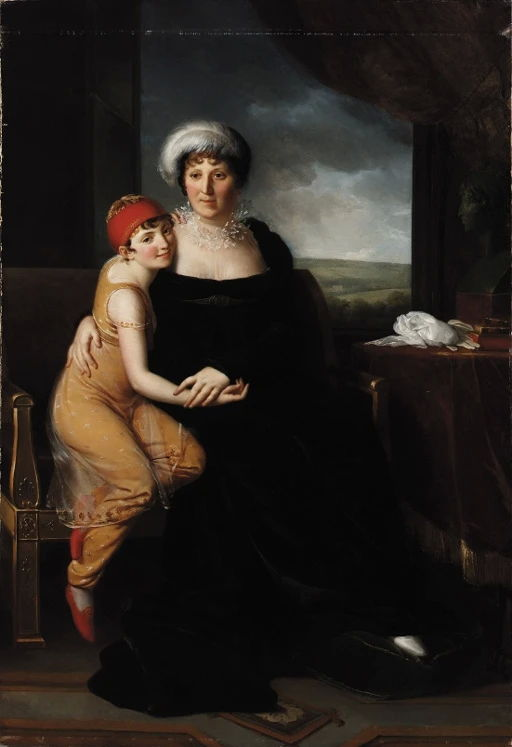
Henriette Campan and her pupil Pholoé, 1807

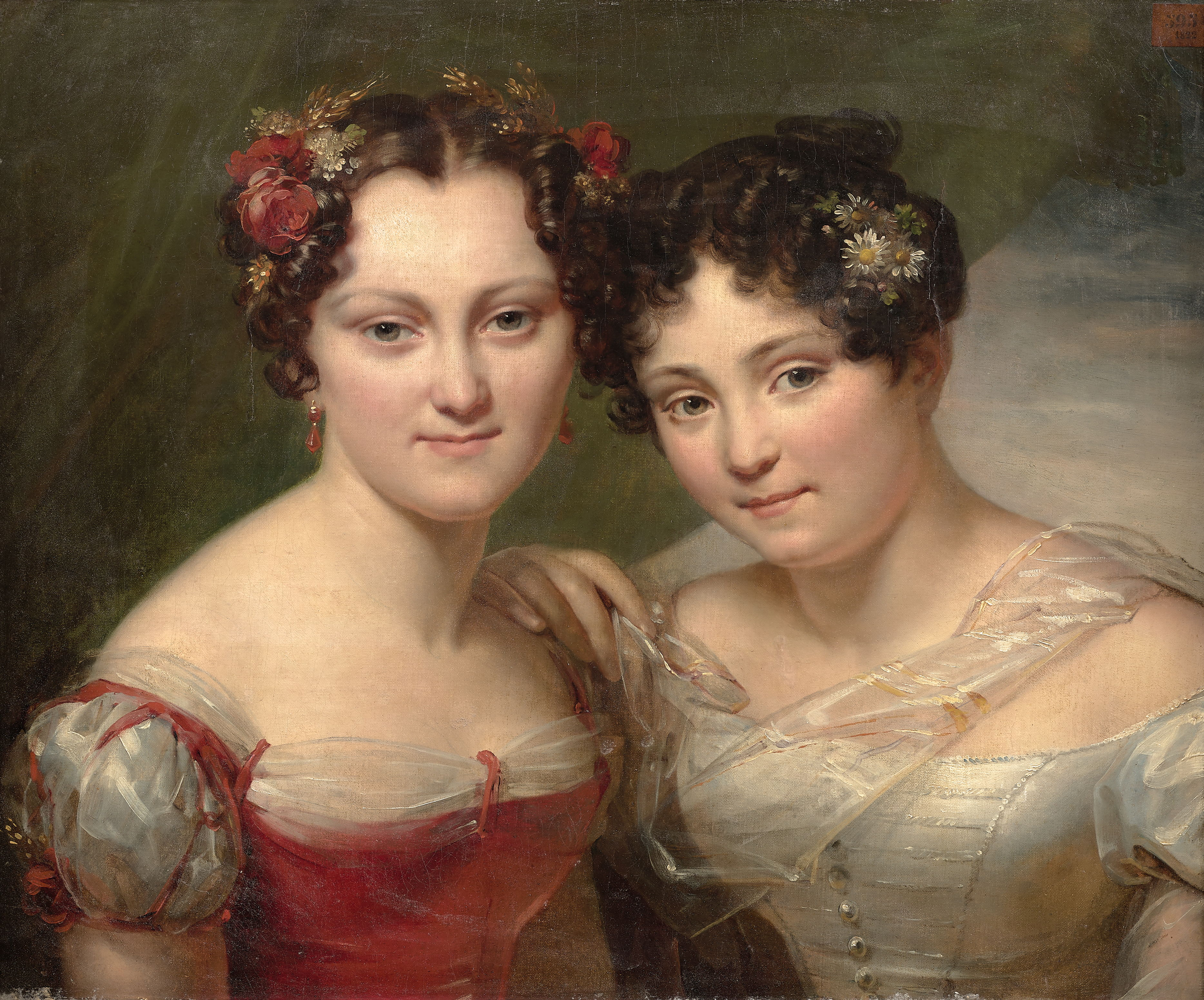
The Sisters Louise Christine and Louise Emilie de Lafontaine, c. 1822

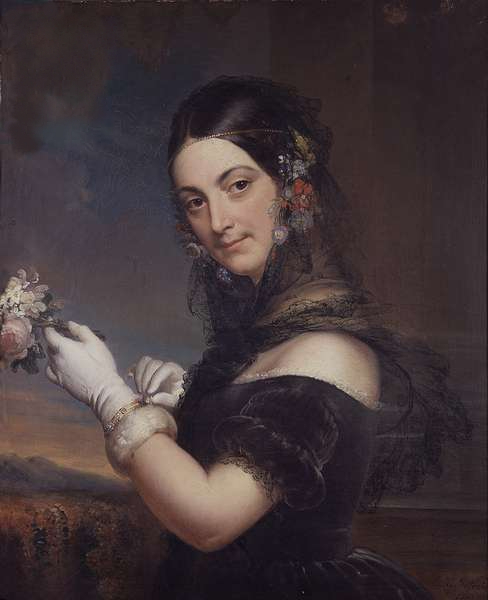
The Opera Vocalist Elena Viganò, 1841

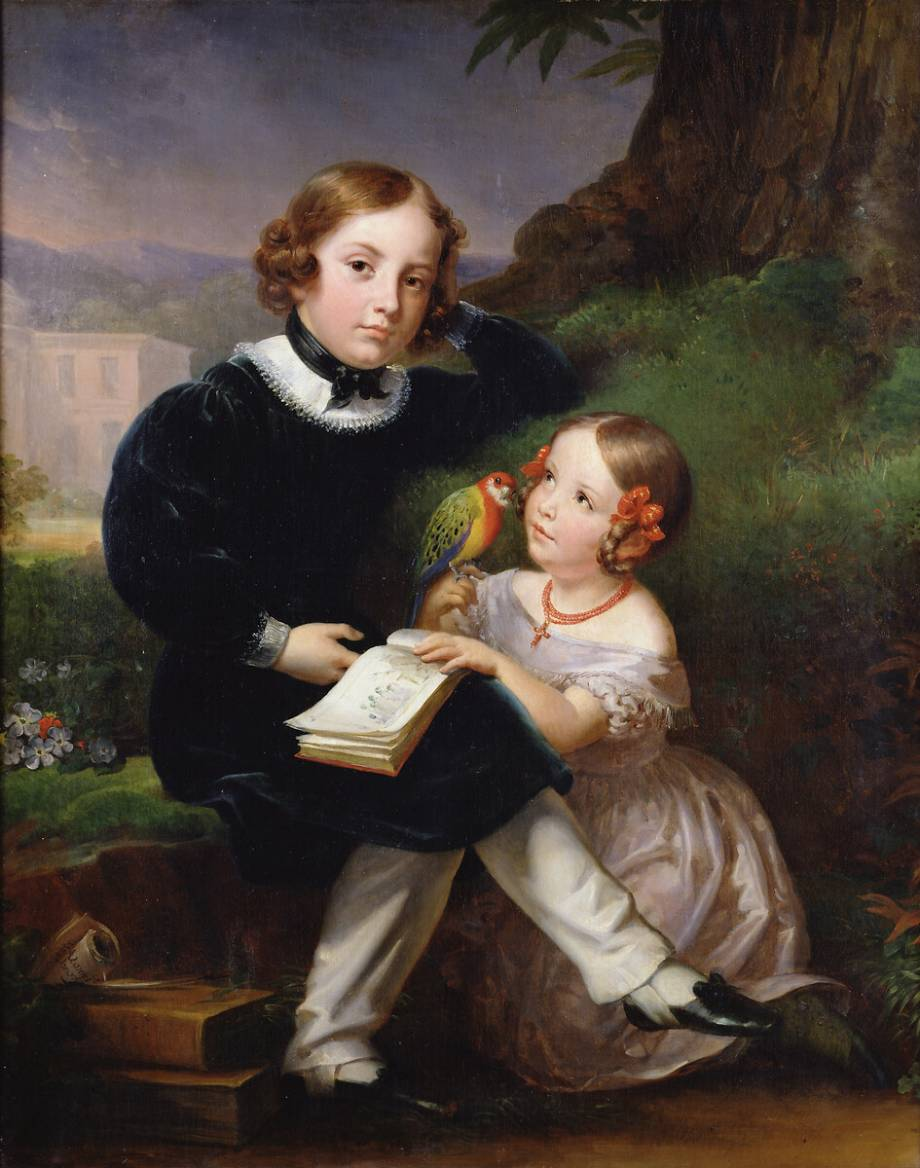
The Children of David d'Angers, c. 1842

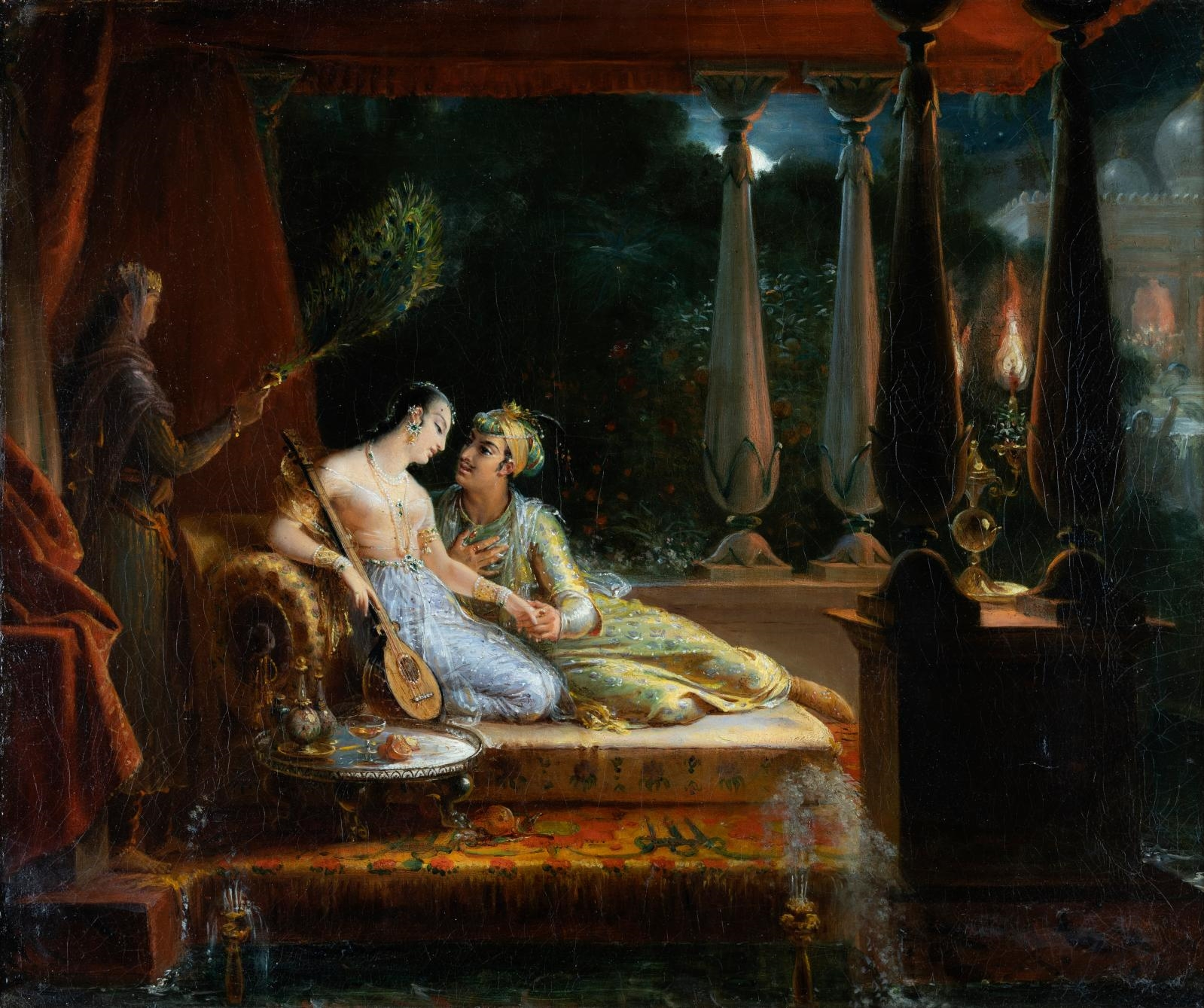
Scheherazade and Shahryar (One Thousand and One Nights), 1842

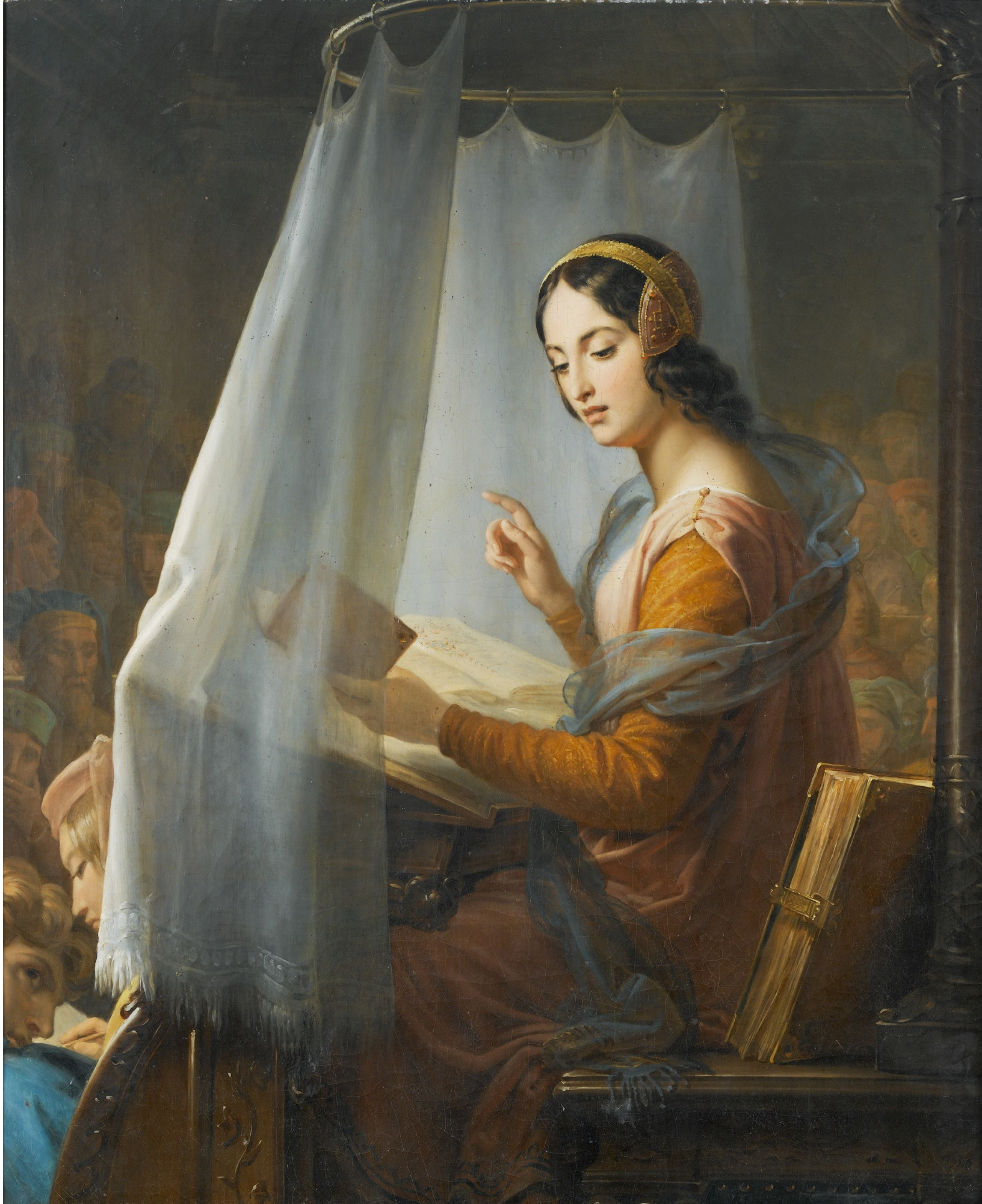
Novella d'Andrea, c. 1843

== Sources ==
- "Godefroid, Marie Eléonor". Benezit Dictionary of Artists. 2011.
- Charles Gabet, Louis Charles Deschamps, Dictionnaire des artistes de l'école française au xixe siècle : peinture, sculpture, architecture, gravure, dessin, lithographie et composition musicale, Paris, Vergne, 1831, p. 316-17.
