= Akmezar, Gülağaç =

Akmezar
- Village
- Location within Turkey Location within Turkey Central Anatolia
- Coordinates: 38.4614°N 34.3157°E
- Country: Turkey
- Province: Aksaray
- District: Gülağaç
- Population (2021): 888
- Time zone: UTC+3 (TRT)

Akmezar is a village in the Gülağaç District, Aksaray Province, Turkey. Its population is 888 (2021).
