= Gregory of Nazianzus the Elder =

Bishop in Cappadocia (c. 276–374)

Saint Gregory of Nazianzus the Elder

Bishop of Nazianzus
- Born: c. 276; Nazianzus (modern-day Nenizi, Aksaray Province, Turkey)
- Died: 374; Nazianzus (modern-day Nenizi, Aksaray Province, Turkey)
- Venerated in: Orthodox Church; Catholic Church
- Canonized: Pre-Congregation
- Feast: 1 January

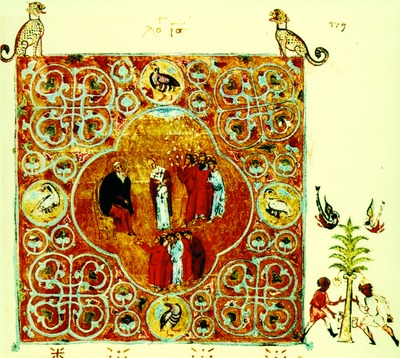
Gregory of Nazianzus the Elder and his son St. Gregory the Theologian preaching in Nazianzus. Miniature from the Homilies of St. Gregory the Theologian, 12th century.

Gregory the Elder or Gregory of Nazianzus the Elder (Greek: Γρηγόριος ό Γέρος; c. 276 – 374) was the bishop of the see of Nazianzus in Roman province of Cappadocia. However, he is better remembered as the patriarch of an important family of ecclesiastics.

== Career ==
A member of the Hypsistarians, a distinct Jewish-pagan sect worshiping Hypsistos, the "Most High" God, Gregory was convinced to convert to Christianity by his wife Nonna in 325. Both Gregory and Nonna came from wealthy families, and Gregory was able to personally finance the construction of a church in the region. In 328, Gregory was selected as bishop of Nazianzus, a position he held until his death. At one point, Gregory subscribed to an Arian understanding of the Trinity. However, this was for a very brief time and he quickly renounced that position.

== Family ==
Three children were born to Gregory and Nonna. One daughter, Saint Gorgonia outlived her parents by only a year, and was lauded in the eulogy given by her brother as a model Christian wife. Their younger son, Caesarius of Nazianzus, studied in Caesarea Mazaca and at Alexandria and became a physician. He served in Constantinople as the court physician for both Constantius II and Julian the Apostate, and died in 368.

Their elder son, also named Gregory (and sometimes known as "the Younger"), served alongside his father first as a priest, and then as coadjutor. Gregory the Younger would later become the Patriarch of Constantinople.
