= Gülağaç District =

- District
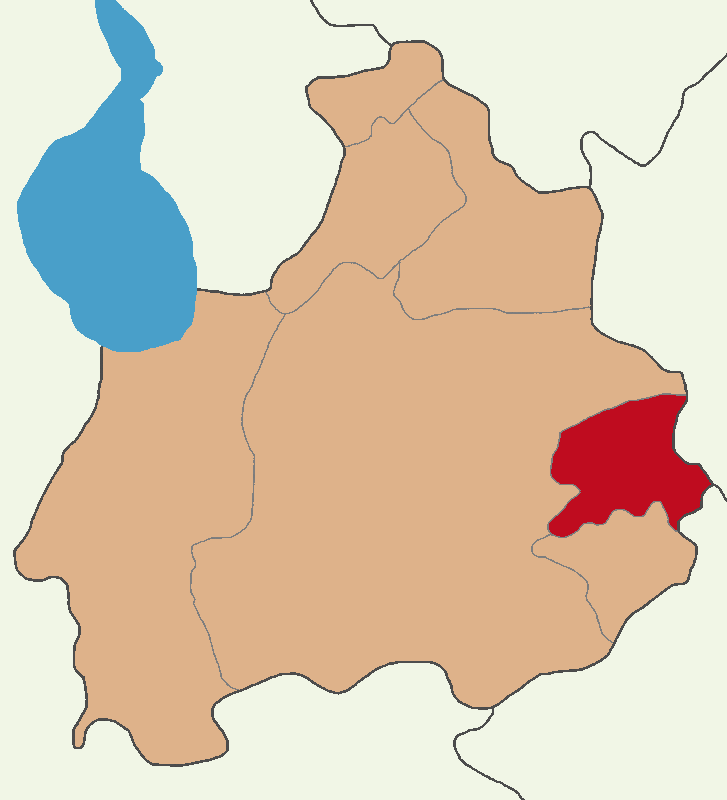
- Map showing Gülağaç District in Aksaray Province

- Location within Turkey Location within Turkey Central Anatolia
- Coordinates: 38°24′N 34°21′E
- Country: Turkey
- Province: Aksaray
- Seat: Gülağaç
- Area: 326 km^{2} (126 sq mi)
- Population (2025): 19,099
  - Density: 58.6/km^{2} (152/sq mi)
- Time zone: UTC+3 (TRT)
- Website: www.gulagac.gov.tr

Gülağaç District is a district of Aksaray Province of Turkey. Spread over an area of 326 km^{2} (126 sq mi), it had a population of 19,099 in 2025. The district consists of four municipalities and nine villages.

== History ==
Aşıklı Höyük, located along the Melendiz River, is one of the earliest human settlements in Central Anatolia. According to scientific research, human occupation in the region has been dated to approximately 10,400–9,300 years before present. The site was excavated beginning in 1989. Gülağaç District was established by law number 3644 on 9 May 1990.

== Geography ==
Gülağaç District is a district of Aksaray Province, Turkey. It lies on a plateau south of Kızılırmak River. It is spread over an area of 326 km^{2} (126 sq mi), with an average altitude of 1,170 m (3,840 ft). The district has several lakes and hot springs. Lake Nar, located in the district, along the border of Aksaray and Niğde Provinces, and has a high mineral content. The district experiences a semi-continental climate.

=== Administrative divisions ===
The district consists of municipalities of Demirci, Gülağaç, Gülpınar, and Saratlı, and nine villages.

- Akmezar
- Bekarlar
- Camiliören
- Çatalsu
- Kızılkaya
- Osmanlı
- Pınarbaşı
- Sofular
- Süleymanhüyüğü

== Demographics and economy ==
According to 2025 population statistics published by the Turkish Statistical Institute, Gülağaç District had a population of 19,099 inhabitants, including 9,696 males and 9,403 females. It was the fourth most populous district in Aksaray Province, accounting for approximately 4.3% of the provincial population. Its population reduced by approximately 2.8% between 2020 and 2025.

Agriculture and animal husbandry are amongst the key economic activities. The district had approximately 186,963 hectares (462,000 acres) of agricultural land in 2025.
