= Sofular, Gülağaç =

Sofular
- Village
- Location within Turkey Location within Turkey Central Anatolia
- Country: Turkey
- Province: Aksaray
- District: Gülağaç
- Population (2021): 936
- Time zone: UTC+3 (TRT)

Sofular, formerly known as Sorsovi or Borissós, is a village in the Gülağaç District, Aksaray Province, Turkey. Its population is 936 (2021). Before the 2013 reorganisation, it was a town (belde).
