= Camiliören =

- Village
- Location within Turkey Location within Turkey Central Anatolia
- Coordinates: 38.5048°N 34.3888°E
- Country: Turkey
- Province: Aksaray
- District: Gülağaç
- Population (2021): 561
- Time zone: UTC+3 (TRT)

Camiliören is a village in the Gülağaç District, Aksaray Province, Turkey. Its population is 561 (2021).
