= Arianzus =

Town in ancient Cappadocia, Turkey

Coordinates: 38°15′39″N 34°23′16″E

Arianzus or Arianzos (Greek: Αριανζός) was a town of ancient Cappadocia, inhabited in Byzantine times. Arianzus is a titular see of the Ecumenical Patriarchate of Constantinople. Gregory of Nazianzus was born in Arianzus.

Its site is located near the Sivrihisar settlement in Güzelyurt, Asiatic Turkey.
