= Giacomo Filippo Fransoni =

Italian prelate and cardinal

His Eminence Giacomo Filippo Fransoni
- Titular Archbishop of Nazianzus
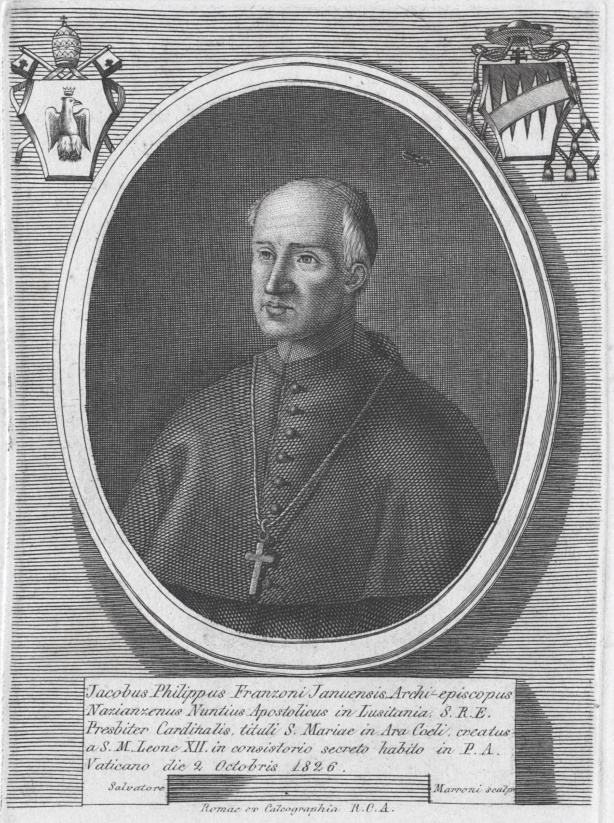
- Kardinal Giacomo Filippo Fransoni
- Appointed: 27 September 1822
- Term ended: 20 April 1856
- Predecessor: Michele Belli
- Successor: Giacomo Luigi Brignole
- Other post: Prefect of the Sacred Congregation for the Propagation of the Faith (1834–1856)
- Previous posts: Apostolic Nuncio to Portugal (1823–1834); Cardinal Priest of Santa Maria in Aracoeli (1826–1855)

Orders
- Ordination: 14 March 1807
- Consecration: 8 December 1822 by Pietro Francesco Galeffi
- Created cardinal: 2 October 1826 by Pope Leo XII
- Rank: Cardinal Priest

Personal details
- Born: 10 December 1775 Genoa, Republic of Genoa
- Died: 20 April 1856 (aged 80) Rome, Papal States
- Denomination: Roman Catholic

Giacomo Filippo Fransoni (10 December 1775 – 20 April 1856) was an Italian prelate and cardinal who served from 1834 to 1856 as prefect of the Sacred Congregation for the Propagation of the Faith. He was the cardinal priest of the Church of San Lorenzo in Lucina at the time of his death.

== Life ==
Born in Genoa, Fransoni was ordained a priest on 14 March 1807, at 31 years of age, by Cardinal Pietro Francesco Galeffi. On 7 September 1822, he was appointed Titular Archbishop of Nazianzus and ordained to the episcopate three months later. On 21 January 1823, aged 47, he was appointed Apostolic Nuncio to Portugal. On 2 October 1826, aged 50, he was elevated to the cardinalate and named cardinal priest of the Basilica of Santa Maria in Aracoeli.

On 21 November 1834, Fransoni was appointed prefect of the Sacred Congregation for the Propagation of the Faith in the Curia. On 28 September 1855, aged almost 80, his titular church was changed to that of the Church of San Lorenzo in Lucina.

Fransoni died on 20 April 1856, aged 80. He had been a priest for 49 years, a bishop for 33 and a cardinal for almost 30.

Fransoni is in the episcopal lineage of Pope Francis. Among those whom he ordained as priests was the English convert, John Henry Newman, Cong.Orat.
