= Beniamino Cavicchioni =

Italian cardinal and papal diplomat

His Eminence Beniamino Cavicchioni
- Prefect of the Congregation for Studies
- Church: Roman Catholic Church
- Appointed: 11 March 1910
- Term ended: 17 April 1911
- Predecessor: Francesco Satolli
- Successor: Benedetto Lorenzelli
- Other post: Cardinal-Priest of Santa Maria in Ara Coeli (1903-11)
- Previous posts: Apostolic Delegate to Ecuador (1884-85); Apostolic Delegate to Bolivia (1884-85); Apostolic Delegate to Peru (1884-85); Titular Archbishop of Amida (1884-94); Titular Archbishop of Nazianzus (1894-1903); Secretary for Seminaries of the Congregation of the Council (1895-1900); Secretary of the Congregation of the Council (1900-03)

Orders
- Ordination: 18 December 1859
- Consecration: 27 April 1884 by Luigi Serafini
- Created cardinal: 22 June 1903 by Pope Leo XIII
- Rank: Cardinal-Priest

Personal details
- Born: Beniamino Cavicchioni; 27 December 1836 Veiano, Papal States
- Died: 17 April 1911 (aged 74) Rome, Kingdom of Italy
- Buried: Campo Verano
- Education: Sapienza University of Rome

Beniamino Cavicchioni (27 December 1836 – 17 April 1911) was an Italian cardinal of the Catholic Church. He was a papal diplomat and worked in the Roman Curia.

== Biography ==
He was born in Pago Veiano, Italy, on 27 December 1836. He was ordained a priest on 18 December 1859.

He worked on the staff of the Congregation for the Propagation of the Faith with particular responsibility for the United States.

On 21 March 1884, Pope Leo XIII appointed him titular archbishop of Amida and Apostolic Delegate to Bolivia, Ecuador, and Peru. He received his episcopal consecration on 27 April from Cardinal Luigi Serafini.

He returned to Rome in 1889 and worked in the Roman Curia.

Pope Leo XIII made him Cardinal-Priest of Santa Maria in Ara Coeli in the consistory held on 22 June 1903.

From 11 March 1910 he was Prefect of the Congregation for Religious Studies.

Cavicchioni underwent surgery and died a few days later on 17 April 1911 in Rome.
