= Kızılkaya, Gülağaç =

Kızılkaya
- Village
- Location within Turkey Location within Turkey Central Anatolia
- Country: Turkey
- Province: Aksaray
- District: Gülağaç
- Population (2021): 1,286
- Time zone: UTC+3 (TRT)

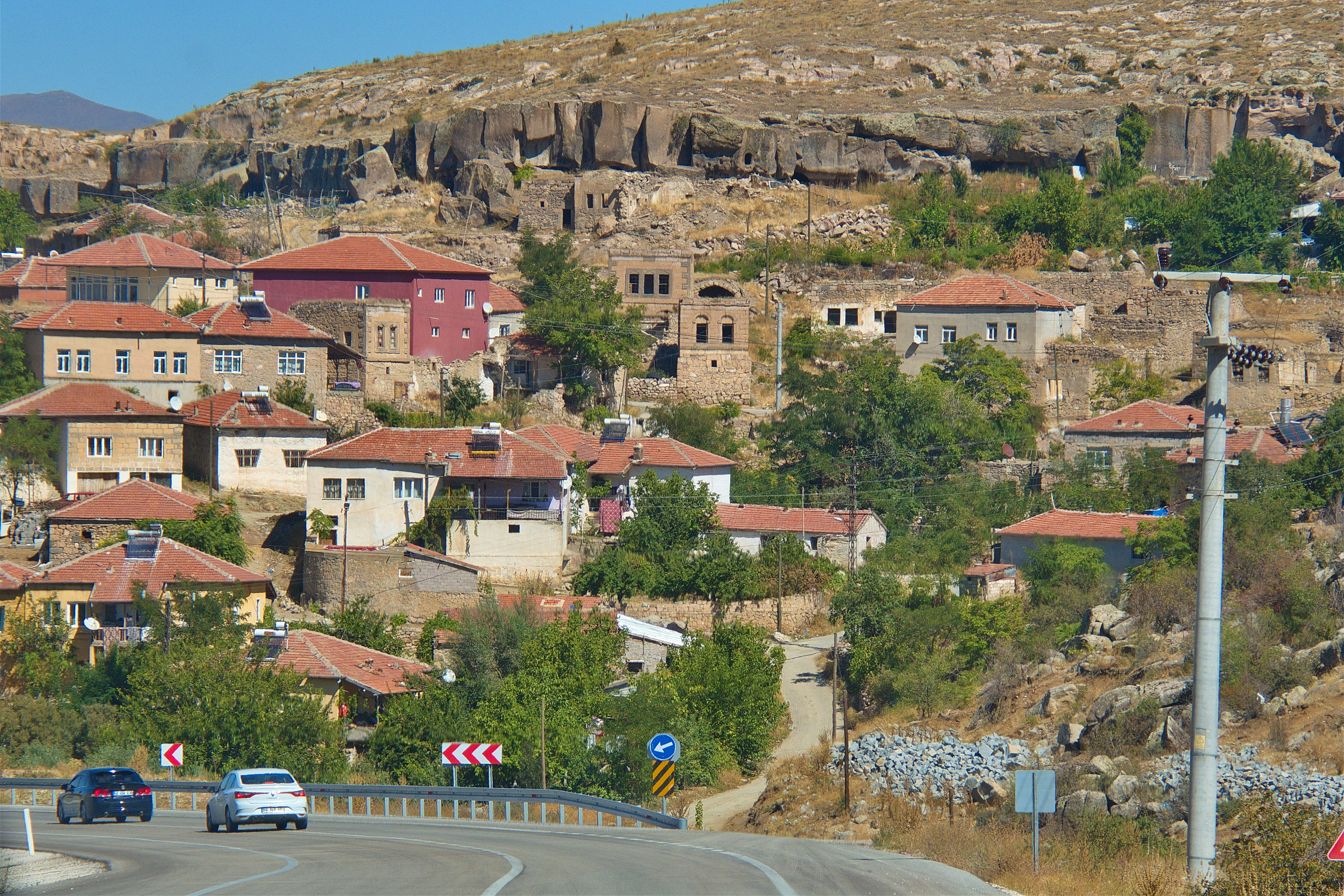

Kızılkaya is a village in the Gülağaç District, Aksaray Province, Turkey. Its population is 1,286 (2021).
