= DeAndrea =

DeAndrea is a surname and a primarily feminine given name. The surname is of Italian origin, and is a patronymic meaning 'son of Andrea', which is a cognate of Andrew, while the given name is unrelated and is a combination of the elements de and the name Andrea, and is often found among African Americans. Notable people with the name include:

== Surname ==
- William L. DeAndrea (1952–1996), American mystery writer and columnist

== Given name ==
- DeAndrea G. Benjamin (born 1972), American lawyer and judge
- DeAndrea Salvador, American politician

== See also ==
- D'Andrea
