= Pınarbaşı, Gülağaç =

Pınarbaşı
- Village
- Location within Turkey Location within Turkey Central Anatolia
- Country: Turkey
- Province: Aksaray
- District: Gülağaç
- Population (2021): 249
- Time zone: UTC+3 (TRT)

Pınarbaşı is a village in the Gülağaç District, Aksaray Province, Turkey. Its population is 249 (2021).
