= Anthimus of Tyana =

Bishop in the fourth century

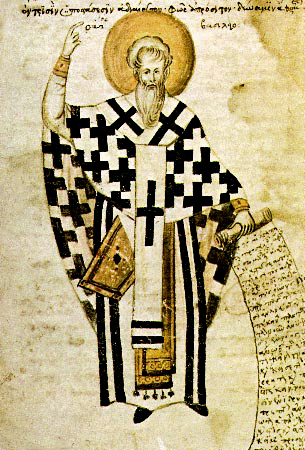

Anthimus of Tyana was a Christian bishop of the Cappadocian city of Tyana. Tyana increased in prominence when Roman Emperor Valens divided Cappadocia into two provinces and Tyana became the capital of Cappadocian Secundus in 371. This led to the conflict with Basil of Caesarea (the previous capital of the combined Cappadocia), who had only become bishop there in 370, for which Anthimus of Tyana is best known.

Anthimus asserted that the change in his city's political status should be matched with a change in its religious status and declared himself in authority over several Cappadocian towns in his new province which had previously been under Basil's oversight. His success in enforcing these claims within his province was aided by the presence of Arians who did not wish to be under Basil's authority, though the evidence points against Anthimus himself being Arian. The conflict became physical at one point when Basil and his friend Gregory of Nazianzus set out with a mule train to collect supplies from the monastery of St. Orestes, which was under Basil's authority. Some of Anthimus' retainers blocked their path close to St. Orestes, near Sasima, and a scuffle broke out. In 372 as a part of the conflict Basil set up Gregory of Nazianzus as bishop of the small town of Sasima which Anthimus claimed authority over. It was little more than a junction of roads and previously had no bishop. Now it gained a bishop from each side, with Anthimus' choice staying. Likewise Basil made his younger brother Gregory bishop of Nyssa to aid in the conflict. He attempted to establish his authority at Doara by similar means. Basil and Anthimus later settled their differences; Eusebius of Samosata seems to have mediated the conflict and each bishop was accepted as having authority over his own region. At some point in the process Nazianzus was acknowledged to owe its allegiance to Tyana. Before complete peace came to prevail between Anthimus and Basil a new upset emerged with Basil over Anthimus' willingness to accept a candidate named Faustus for installation as a bishop in Armenia. Faustus had first come to Basil and been turned down until such time as Theodotus of Nicopolis and other Armenian bishops could be consulted, but upon turning to Anthimus he received his request.

In any case by 375 Gregory considered Anthimus to be in complete agreement with him. Anthimus was described as elderly when this conflict began, and we hear little more of him after its end. The most significant impact of these events was a break in affection between Gregory of Nazianzus and Basil over the pressure Basil had placed on him to take his new role. That break lasted to Basil's death in 379.
