= Osmanlı, Gülağaç =

Osmanlı
- Village
- Location within Turkey Location within Turkey Central Anatolia
- Coordinates: 38°29′N 34°21′E
- Country: Turkey
- Province: Aksaray
- District: Gülağaç
- Population (2021): 167
- Time zone: UTC+3 (TRT)

Osmanlı (formerly: Düğüz) is a village in the Gülağaç District, Aksaray Province, Turkey. Its population is 167 (2021). The village is populated by Kurds.
