= Karbala (Cappadocia) =

Town of ancient Cappadocia

Coordinates: 38°16′48″N 34°19′57″E

Karbala was a town of ancient Cappadocia, inhabited in Byzantine times. It is the birthplace of Gregory of Nazianzus.

Its site is located near Güzelyurt, Asiatic Turkey.
