= Enrico Enríquez =

Italian Roman Catholic cardinal

His Eminence Enrico Enríquez
- Cardinal-Priest of Sant'Eusebio
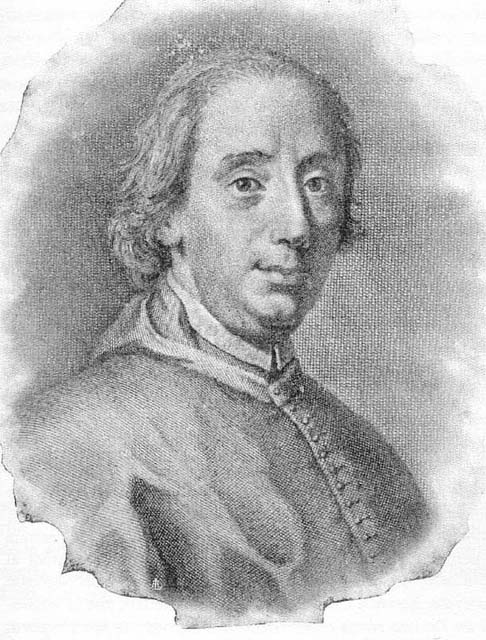
- Church: Roman Catholic Church
- Appointed: 22 July 1754
- Term ended: 25 April 1756
- Predecessor: Pompeo Aldrovandi
- Successor: Jean-François-Joseph de Rochechouart
- Previous posts: Titular Archbishop of Nazianzus (1743-53); Apostolic Nuncio to Spain (1744-53)

Orders
- Consecration: 29 December 1743 by Pope Benedict XIV
- Created cardinal: 26 November 1753 by Pope Benedict XIV
- Rank: Cardinal-Priest

Personal details
- Born: Enrico Enríquez; 30 September 1701 Campi Salentina, Kingdom of Naples
- Died: 25 April 1756 (aged 54) Ravenna, Papal States
- Parents: Giovanni Enríquez; Cecilia Capece Minutolo
- Education: Sapienza University of Rome
- Coat of arms

Enrique Enríquez (30 September 1701 – 25 April 1756) was an Italian Roman Catholic cardinal.

== Early life and education ==
Born in Campi Salentina, in the Kingdom of Naples, he studied canon and civil law at the La Sapienza University, Rome, was later made governor of several towns until 1743, when he received the minor orders.

== Career ==
On 16 December 1743, he was elected titular archbishop of Nazianzo and was sent as Apostolic nuncio to Spain on 8 January 1744. Pope Benedict XIV created him cardinal priest in the consistory of 26 November 1753, with the title of Sant'Eusebio. As legate to Ravenna, he reestablished the independence of the Republic of San Marino, which his predecessor Cardinal Giulio Alberoni had suppressed.

== Death ==
Enriquez died in 1756 at Ravenna.
