= Lake Nar =

- Nar Gölü (Turkish)
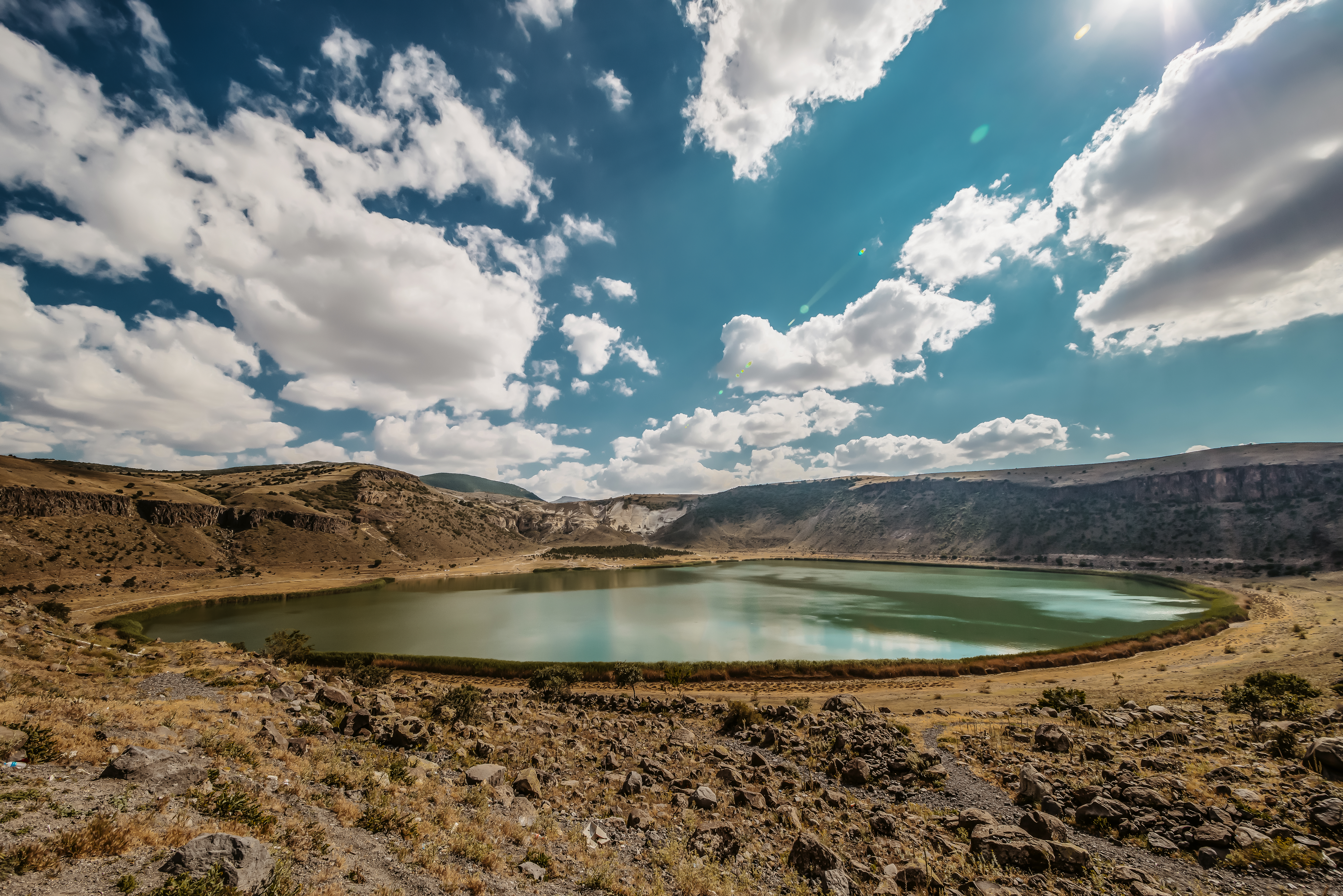
- Lake Nar

- Location within Turkey
- Location: Aksaray Province, Niğde Province
- Coordinates: 38°20′24.43″N 34°27′23.69″E
- Type: Volcanic crater lake
- Basin countries: Turkey
- Surface area: 0.7 km^{2} (0.27 sq mi)
- Average depth: 21 m (69 ft)
- Surface elevation: 1,363 m (4,472 ft)
- Settlements: Gülağaç

Lake Nar (Turkish: Nar or Narlı Gölü) is a brackish lake situated on the borderline between Aksaray Province and Niğde Province of central Turkey (38°20′24.43″N 34°27′23.69″E altitude:1,363 metres (4,472 ft) AMSL). It is around 21 metres deep and 0.7 square kilometres in area. The lake basin formed as a result of volcanic activity; specifically it is classed as a maar lake. There is still geothermal activity in the area, which has given rise to hot springs around the lake. In recent years, the geothermal waters have been pumped up to nearby hotels for use in their hot baths.

Lake Nar is particularly known for its scientific importance. It is home to a newly-described species of microscopic diatom algae called Clipeoparvus anatolicus. Nar lake waters undergo a remarkable change between different seasons. In winter, the lake water is cold from top to bottom. As the temperature increases in the spring, the lake water divides into an upper half which is warm (epilimnion), while the lower half (hypolimnion) stays cold and lacking in oxygen. An abundance of planktonic algae (or plankton bloom) in early summer changes the water chemistry and leads to the precipitation of calcium carbonate. As a result, the mud at the bottom of the lake is made of alternating black and white layers (or varves) representing different seasons of the year. Like tree rings, they create a natural geological clock. The best known other example of a varve-forming lake in Turkey is Lake Van.

Work has been carried out on its sediments and waters by a team of British, Turkish and French researchers. Since 1997, water samples have been taken from the lake to monitor how the lake level and chemistry has changed with climate. Over this period, central Turkey experience a shift to drier conditions (especially hotter summers with more evaporation), which was seen in Lake Nar as a lake level fall and a change in the chemistry of the lake.

Sediment cores taken from Nar lake have been dated by counting individual layers back thousands of years. Laboratory analysis of these sediment cores has enabled the history of climate and human activities to be reconstructed in great detail. For example, pollen analysis has shown how the Arab invasions of central Anatolia during the 8th and 9th centuries destroyed Cappadocia’s late antique rural economy based on tree crops and cereal cultivation, the so-called Beyşehir Occupation phase. In 2010, new core samples were taken from the lake sediments, extending from the present lake bed at around 21 metres water depth to over 21 metres below the lake bed. This sediment record extends from the present day back to around 14,000 years ago, and by analysing the changes in the chemistry of the sediments it has been possible to reconstruct how the lake level, and hence how the climate of central Turkey, has changed over time. After a dry period at the time of the northern European Younger Dryas cold period, there was a rapid shift to wetter conditions ~11,700 years ago. It stayed wet for several thousand years, and then gradually got drier, reaching a peak around 4,000-2,000 years ago.
