= Süleymanhüyüğü, Gülağaç =

Süleymanhüyüğü
- Village
- Location within Turkey Location within Turkey Central Anatolia
- Coordinates: 38°30′N 34°20′E
- Country: Turkey
- Province: Aksaray
- District: Gülağaç
- Population (2021): 275
- Time zone: UTC+3 (TRT)

Süleymanhüyüğü is a village in the Gülağaç District, Aksaray Province, Turkey. Its population is 275 (2021).
