= Çatalsu, Gülağaç =

Çatalsu
- Village
- Location within Turkey Location within Turkey Central Anatolia
- Country: Turkey
- Province: Aksaray
- District: Gülağaç
- Population (2021): 280
- Time zone: UTC+3 (TRT)

Çatalsu, formerly Absari, is a village in the Gülağaç District, Aksaray Province, Turkey. Its population is 280 (2021). Its distance to Gülağaç is 17 km and to Aksaray is 35 km.
