= Novella d'Andrea =

Italian medieval law scholar

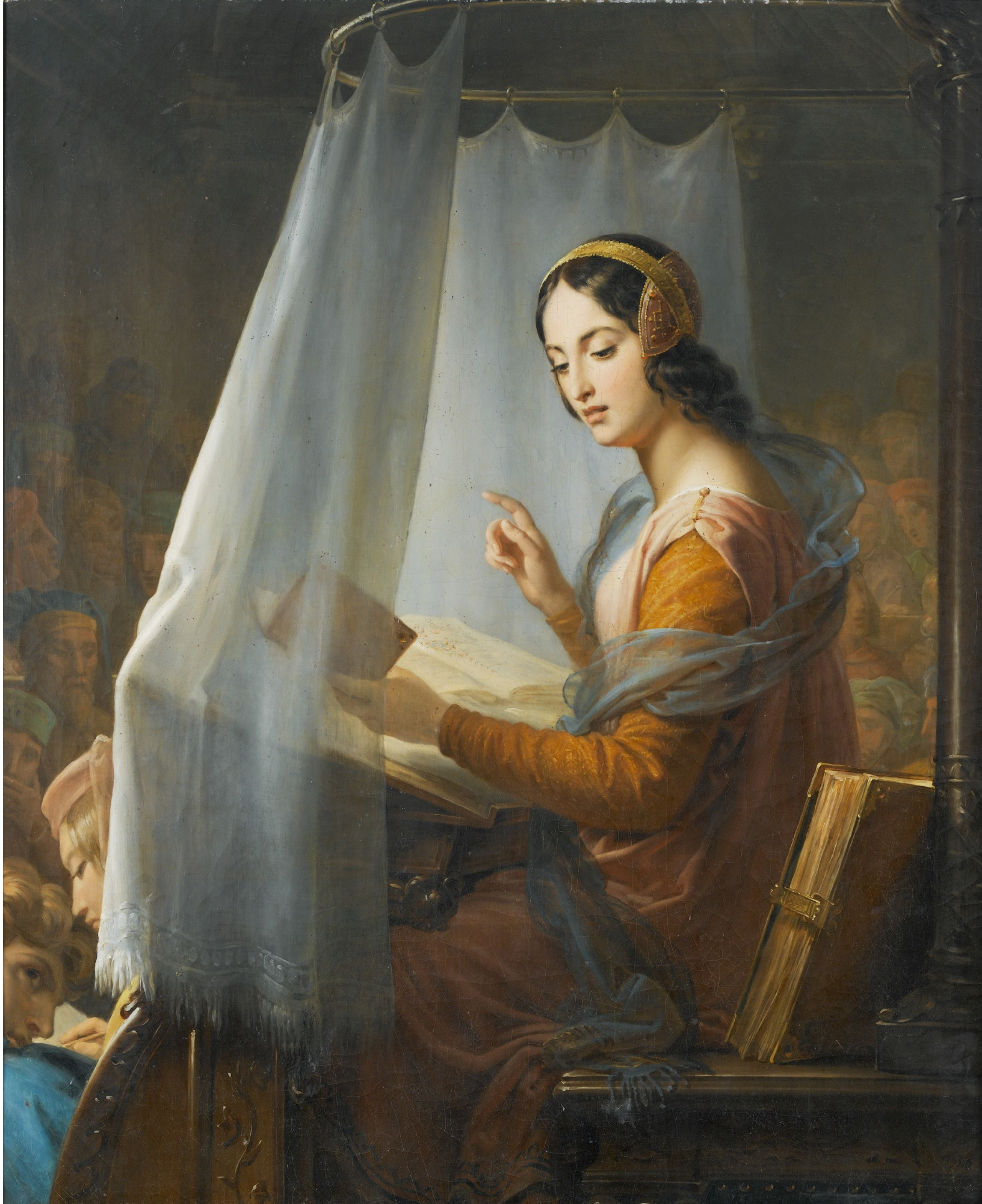
Novella d'Andrea, 19th century painting by Marie-Éléonore Godefroid

Novella d'Andrea (Bologna, 1312–1333 (or around 1346 or 1366) was an Italian legal scholar and professor in law at the University of Bologna.

As the daughter of Giovanni d'Andrea, a professor in Canon law at the University of Bologna, she was educated by her father and reportedly took over his lectures at the university during his absence. According to Christine de Pisan, she talked to the students through a curtain so they would not be distracted by her beauty. Some suggest that she married the lawyer Giovanni Calderinus or the professor John of Legnano, but, according to others sources she married the lawyer Filippo Formaglini in 1326. She died young. Her father supposedly gave his work about the decretals of Pope Gregory IX the name Novellae to her memory.

Her sister, Bettina d'Andrea, is reported to have taught law and philosophy at the university at Padua, where her husband Giovanni Da Sangiorgio was also employed, until her death in 1335.
