= Saratlı, Gülağaç =

Saratlı
- Municipality
- Location in Turkey Saratlı (Turkey Central Anatolia)
- Coordinates: 38°27′N 34°14′E
- Country: Turkey
- Province: Aksaray
- District: Gülağaç
- Population (2021): 2,084
- Time zone: UTC+3 (TRT)

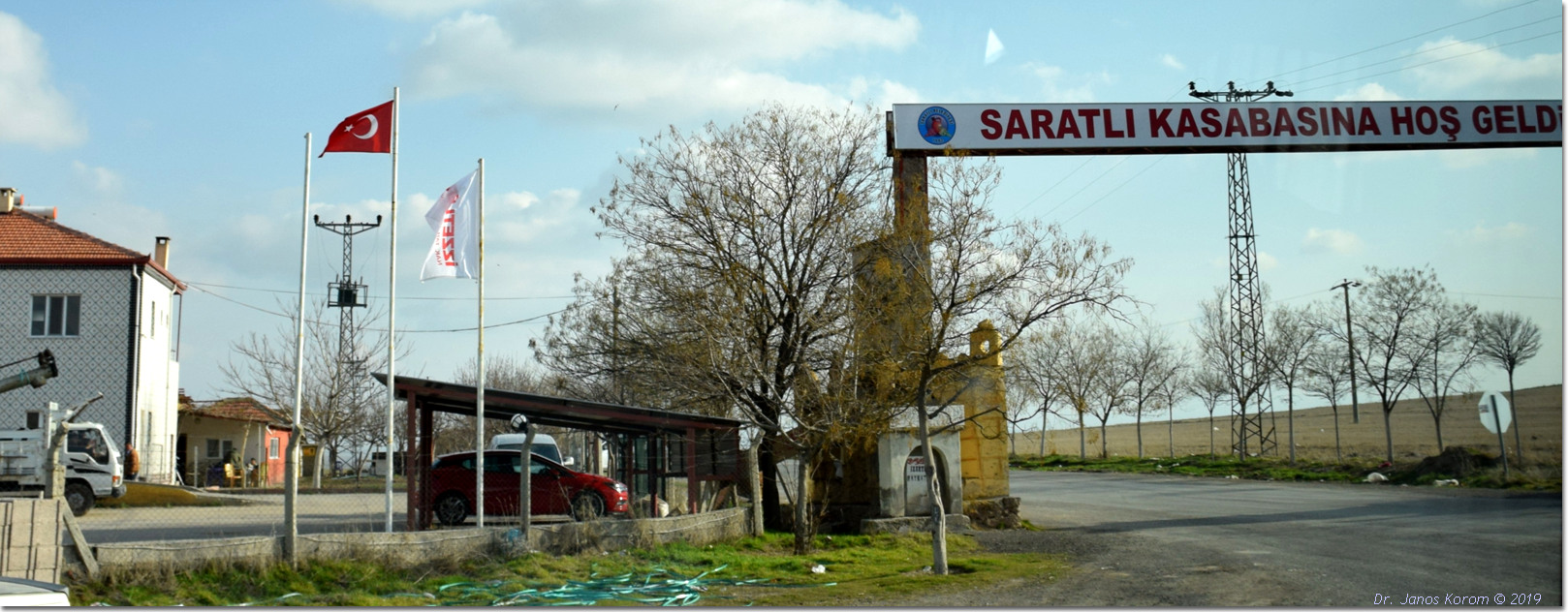
Saratlı town, Aksaray, Turkey

Saratlı is a town (belde) and municipality in the Gülağaç District, Aksaray Province, Turkey. Its population is 2,084 (2021).
