= Gerolamo Marquese d'Andrea =

Italian Cardinal

His Eminence Girolamo d'Andrea
- Prefect Emeritus of the Congregation of the Index
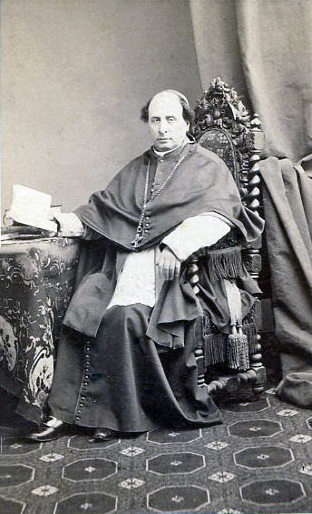
- The cardinal pictured sometime in 1852–1868.
- Church: Roman Catholic Church
- Appointed: 4 July 1853
- Term ended: 31 July 1861
- Predecessor: Giacomo Luigi Brignole
- Successor: Lodovico Altieri
- Other posts: Cardinal-Priest of Sant'Agnese fuori le mura (1852–68); Cardinal-Bishop of Sabina (1860–68)
- Previous posts: Titular Archbishop of Melitene (1841–52); Secretary of the Congregation of the Council (1845–52)

Orders
- Ordination: 4 October 1835
- Consecration: 18 July 1841 by Luigi Lambruschini
- Created cardinal: 15 March 1852 by Pope Pius IX
- Rank: Cardinal-Priest (1852–60); Cardinal-Bishop (1860–68)

Personal details
- Born: Girolamo d'Andrea; 12 April 1812 Naples, Kingdom of Naples
- Died: 14 May 1868 (aged 56) Rome, Papal States
- Buried: Sant'Agnese fuori le mura
- Parents: Giovanni d'Andrea; Lucrezia Rivera
- Education: Collegio Romano; Pontifical Academy of Ecclesiastical Nobles
- Coat of arms

Girolamo d'Andrea (1812–1868) was an Italian Cardinal. He was born at Naples, educated at the Collège of La Flèche, France, and was early appointed Archbishop of Mytilene in partibus infidelium.

== Biography ==
In 1852 he was appointed Cardinal-abbot of Subiaco, and Prefect of the Congregation of the Index, and in 1860 Bishop of Sabina.

He took sides with the Patriotic party in 1859 on the question of the national unity of Italy, and at the same time counseled extensive liberal reforms in Church policy. He was suspended from his diocese and abbacy and threatened with permanent deposition from office. He ultimately submitted, and in 1868 was rehabilitated, without, however, being restored to his diocese and the abbacy of Subiaco.
