= Bettina d'Andrea =

Italian jurist

Bettina d'Andrea (Bologna, 1311–Padua, 5 October 1355) was an Italian legal scholar and professor in law and philosophy at the University of Padua.

As the daughter of Giovanni d'Andrea, professor in Canon law at the University of Bologna, she was educated by her father. She married Giovanni di San Giorgio, a professor at the University of Padua, and became active there as his colleague.

Her sister, Novella d'Andrea, taught law at the University of Bologna until her death.

Bettina's grave states in Latin: "sepulcrum domine bitine, filie qdam [quondam] domini iohanis andrea de bononia archidoctoris decretorum [et] uxoris domini iohanis de sancto georgio de bononia doctoris decreto[rum] que obiit anno domini MCCCLV die lune quinto octubris". This roughly translates into English as: "The grave of Lady Bettina, daughter of master Giovanni d’Andrea from Bologna, great doctor in law, and wife of master Giovanni di San Giorgio from Bologna, doctor in law, who died in 1355, Monday 5th October."

== Bibliography ==
- Londa Schiebinger (1991). The mind has no sex?: women in origins of modern sciences. Cambridge: Harvard University Press. ISBN 0-674-57625-X.
- Jennifer S. Uglow (1982). The Macmillan Dictionary of Women's Biography. Macmillan. ISBN 978-1-4039-3448-2.
