= Caesarius of Nazianzus =

Fourth-century physician and politician

Saint Caesarius of Nazianzus
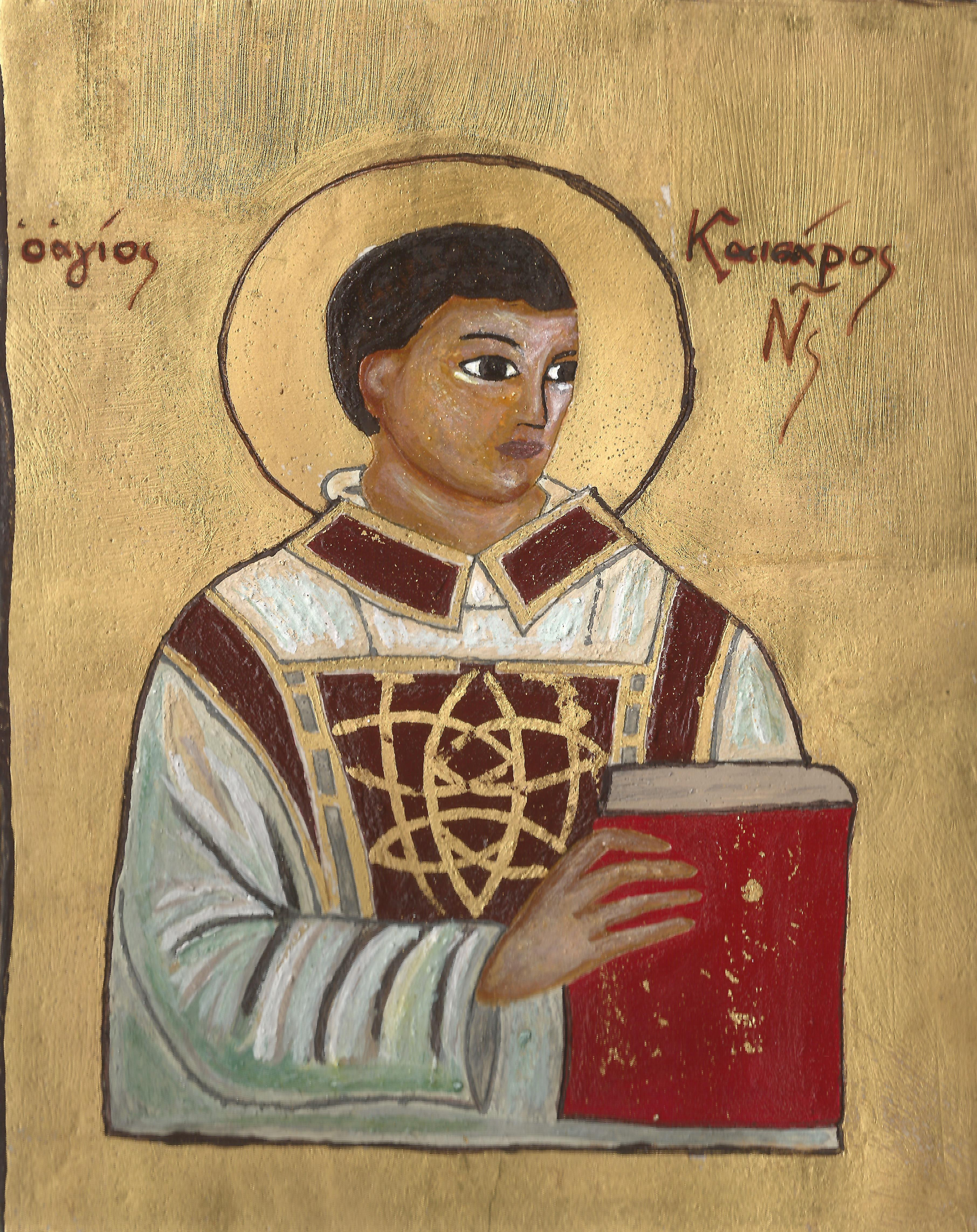
- Born: c. 331; Arianzus, Nazianzus (modern-day Sivrihisar, Eskişehir, Turkey)
- Died: c. 368
- Venerated in: Eastern Orthodox Church; Roman Catholic Church; Apostolic Catholic Church
- Feast: 9 March (Eastern Orthodox)

Caesarius of Nazianzus (Greek: Καισάριος ό Ναζιανζήνος; c. 331 – 368) was a prominent physician and politician. He is best known as the younger brother of Gregory of Nazianzus. He is recognized as a saint in the Eastern Orthodox Church and the Roman Catholic Church.

== Biography ==
The younger son of Gregory the Elder, bishop of Nazianzus, and his wife, Nonna, Caesarius was born at the family villa of Arianzus, near Nazianzus. He probably studied at Caesarea Mazaca in Cappadocia in preparation for the elite schools of Alexandria in Egypt. His favourite studies there were geometry, astronomy and especially medicine. In the last-named science, he surpassed all his fellow students.

About 355 he came to the imperial capital Constantinople, and had already acquired a great reputation for his medical skill, when his brother Gregory, homeward bound from Athens, appeared there about 358. Caesarius sacrificed a remunerative and honourable post to return home with Gregory. The capital soon proved to be too great an attraction for him, and he eventually became an eminent physician at the Byzantine court of Constantius II and, much to the regret of his family, at that of Julian the Apostate. Julian failed in his efforts to win him over to briefly restored Paganism. Caesarius, more appreciative of his faith than of imperial favour, ultimately left the court, but returned to Constantinople after Julian's death in 363.

Under the Emperor Valens Caesarius became quaestor of Bithynia, a position which included treasury and tax collection responsibilities. After escaping from the earthquake which shook Nicaea (11 October, 368), his brother wrote to him, pleading for him to leave his political position and withdraw to a religious life. However, Caesarius was suddenly killed by the widespread plague which followed the earthquake, shortly after having received baptism, which he, like many others at the period, had deferred until late in life. After his death, his very considerable estate was rapidly pillaged by servants and creditors. His brother Gregory insisted that what remained of the estate be distributed to the poor and to surviving relatives. His remains were interred at Nazianzus, where his brother pronounced the funeral oration in the presence of his parents. In the oration, "On His Brother: St. Caesarius", Gregory portrays his brother as a model Christian and ascetic, providing the main source for the details of his life and setting the groundwork for his eventual canonization.

Biographer John McGuckin maintains that, while Caesarius and his brother Gregory were very close, they were very different characters. While Gregory pursued a religious life, his vivacious, outgoing brother was at home in the world of Byzantine politics. The two were complementary figures; Gregory relied on his brother to guide him through trouble, while Caesarius encouraged his brother's literary and rhetorical interests.

The assertion that this Caesarius was the same as that Caesarius, Prefect of Constantinople, who in 365 was thrown into the prison by Procopius, rests on an assumption made by Jacques Godefroy (1587-1652), the editor of the Theodosian Code (Lyon, 1665), and not on any solid historical ground.

The four Dialogues of one hundred and ninety-seven questions and answers which were traditionally ascribed to Caesarius and are to be found in Migne, Patrologia Graeca, XXXVIII, 851–1190, can hardly be from his pen, owing to their nature, contents and anachronisms. They are generally looked upon as spurious.

=== In fiction ===
Caesarius was the main character in a historical novel Gods and Legions, by Michael Curtis Ford (2002). The novel, which tells the story of the rise and fall of Julian the Apostate, is narrated by Caesarius who is, according to the story, his closest companion.
