= Evagrius of Constantinople =

Archbishop of Constantinople in 370

- Archbishop of Constantinople
- Installed: 370
- Term ended: 370
- Predecessor: Demophilus of Constantinople
- Successor: Maximus I of Constantinople

Personal details
- Died: c. 380
- Denomination: Nicene Christianity

Evagrius of Constantinople (Greek: Εὐάγριος; died c. 380) was the archbishop of Constantinople for a brief period in 370.

In 370, the Arians elected Demophilus of Constantinople to fill the bishopric vacancy after the death of Eudoxius of Antioch. The Nicene Christians and the deposed bishop of Antioch Eustathius of Antioch chose Evagrius for that see; but a few months later he was banished by the Roman emperor Valens, and remained in exile until his death.

Some sources claim that he was elected a second time in 379 or 380, after the expulsion of Demophilus by emperor Theodosius I.

== Notes and references ==
Titles of the Great Christian Church
| Preceded by Eudoxius of Antioch | Archbishop of Constantinople; Disputed by Demophilus; 370 | Succeeded by Maximus I |
