= Gülağaç =

- Municipality
- Location within Turkey Location within Turkey Central Anatolia
- Coordinates: 38°24′N 34°21′E
- Country: Turkey
- Province: Aksaray
- District: Gülağaç

Government
  - Mayor: Faruk Teymen (AKP)
- Elevation: 1,170 m (3,840 ft)
- Population (2021): 4,819
- Time zone: UTC+3 (TRT)
- Area code: 0382
- Website: www.gulagac.bel.tr

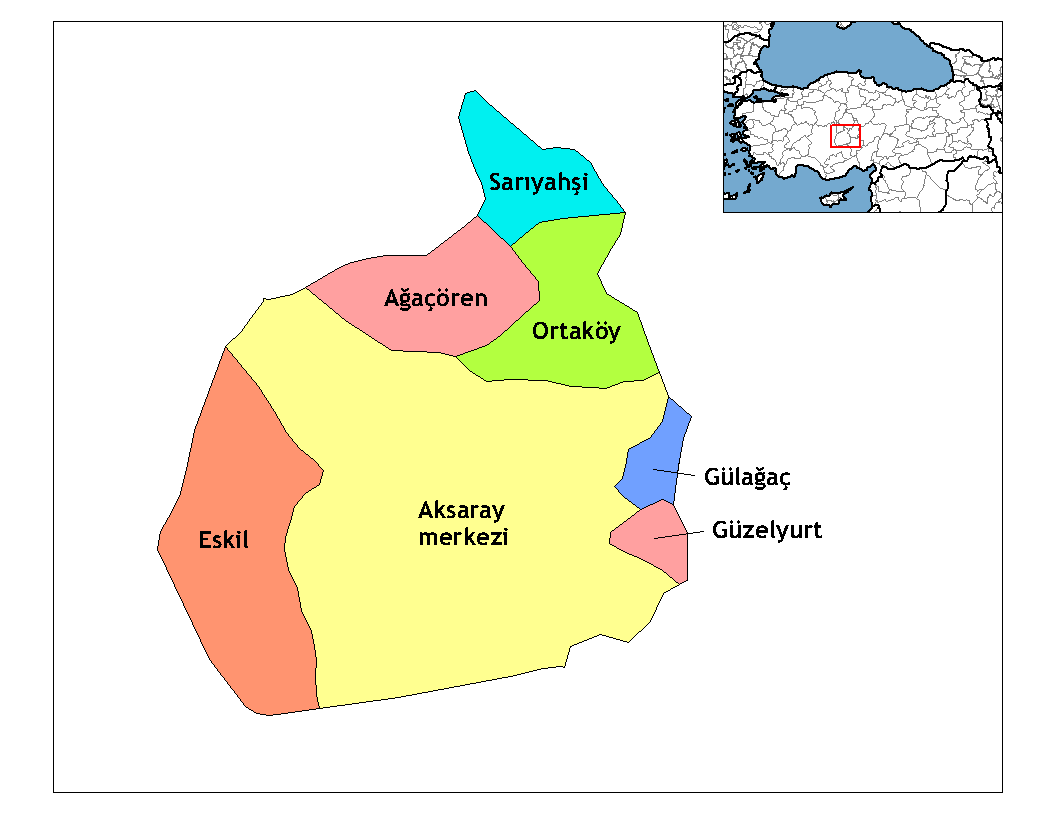
Map of the districts of Aksaray province in Turkey

Gülağaç, formerly Ağaçlı, is a town in Aksaray Province in the Central Anatolia region of Turkey. It is the seat of Gülağaç District. Its population is 4,819 (2021). The average elevation is 1,170 m (3,839 ft).
