= Demophilus of Constantinople =

Archbishop of Constantinople from 370 to 380

- Archbishop of Constantinople
- Installed: Early 370
- Term ended: 27 November 380
- Predecessor: Eudoxius of Antioch
- Successor: Evagrius of Constantinople

Personal details
- Born: Thessalonica
- Died: 386
- Denomination: Arian Christianity

Demophilus of Constantinople (Greek: Δημόφιλος; died 386) was a bishop of Berea and an Archbishop of Constantinople from Early 370 until he was expelled on 27 November 380.

== Biography ==
Born of good family in Thessalonica, he was elected by the Arians to the bishopric of Constantinople. The opinion of the populace, however, was much divided. The orthodox party chose Evagrius for their bishop, and he was ordained by Eustathius of Antioch, the deposed bishop of Antioch. This was the signal for a furious outburst from the Arians. Both Eustathius and Evagrius were banished by the Roman emperor Valens, and their followers bitterly persecuted.

Soon after his accession, Demophilus went to Cyzicus with Dorotheus, or Theodorus, of Heraclea to procure the election of an Arian bishop, which was left vacant since the banishment of Eunomius of Cyzicus. Nevertheless, the people of Cyzicus refused to acknowledge them until they had anathematized Aëtius of Antioch, Eunomius of Cyzicus, and their followers. They were then permitted to ordain a bishop chosen by the people. The bishop who was ordained straightway and clearly taught the consubstantial faith.

In 380 Roman emperor Theodosius I made the patriarchate of Demophilus memorable. Theodosius I offered to confirm him in his see if he would accept the Nicene Creed. Demophilus refused and was immediately ordered to give up his church. He then called his followers together and retired, with Lucius of Alexandria and others, to a church outside of the city walls. The churches of Constantinople, which had for forty years been in Arian hands, were now restored to the orthodox; and similarly in other cities.

Philostorgius adds that Demophilus went to his own city, Berea; however this must have been some time afterwards, or he must have returned from exile, for he represented the Arian party at the synod in Constantinople in 383. The same writer says that Demophilus was wont to throw everything into confusion, especially the doctrines of the Catholic Church, and quotes from a sermon at Constantinople, in which he spoke of the human nature of the Saviour as lost in the divine, as a glass of milk when poured into the sea.

== Notes and references ==
=== Attribution ===
- Onslow used the following sources:
  - Philostorgius. H. E., ix, 10, 13, 14, 19;
  - Philostorgius Patrol. Gk., lxv;
  - Socrates Scholasticus H. E., iv, 14, v, 7, 10;
  - Sozomenus H. E. vi, 13, 14; vii, 12;
  - Soz. and Socr. Patrol. Gk. lxvii.

Titles of the Great Christian Church
Preceded by Eudoxius of Antioch	Archbishop of Constantinople; 370 – 380	Succeeded by Evagrius
