= Bekarlar, Gülağaç =

Bekarlar
- Village
- Location within Turkey Location within Turkey Central Anatolia
- Coordinates: 38°23′N 34°26′E
- Country: Turkey
- Province: Aksaray
- District: Gülağaç
- Population (2021): 1,040
- Time zone: UTC+3 (TRT)

Bekarlar, recently known as Nenizi and in earlier times Nazianzus, is a Turkish - greek village in the Gülağaç District, Aksaray Province, Turkey. Its population is 1,040 (2021).

== History ==
The name of the village is mentioned as Nenezi in the records of 1928. It became a town on December 31, 1987 with the status of municipality. While it was previously affiliated to Çiftlik District in Niğde Province, with the decision on 19 June 1996, it was attached to Gülağaç District in Aksaray Province. Bekarlar's municipality status ended at the 2013 reorganisation, when the population dropped below 2000 people.
