= Nazianzus =

Town in ancient Cappadocia

Coordinates: 38°23′53″N 34°20′59″E

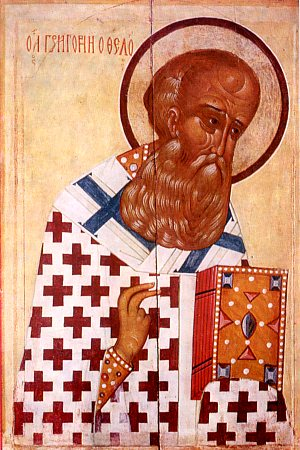
Gregory of Nazianzus

Nazianzus or Nazianzos (Ancient Greek: Ναζιανζός), also known as Nandianulus, was a small town of ancient Cappadocia, and in the late Roman province of Cappadocia Tertia, located 24 Roman miles to the southeast of Archelais. In the Jerusalem Itinerary it is miswritten as Nathiangus.

== History ==
Its history in antiquity is unknown. It became the Turkish village of Nenizi east of Aksaray (formerly Archelais), in the Ottoman villayet of Koniah, but has sometimes been wrongly identified with Diocaesarea.

Modern scholars locate its site near Nenezigözü, Asiatic Turkey. More specifically, the village of Bekarlar, Gülağaç.

== Ecclesiastical history ==
At the beginning of the 4th century Nazianzus was suffragan to Caesarea Mazaca; under Emperor Valens it formed part of Cappadocia Secunda, the metropolis of which was Tyana. Later it became part of Cappadocia Tertia and depended on its Metropolitan of Mocessus. Finally, it became a metropolitan see under Diogenes.

In 1370 it was united to the metropolitan see of Caesarea Mazaca (modern Kayseri).

Up to the year 1200, fourteen of its bishops are known. Its name is inseparably connected with its illustrious doctor and poet-bishop, Gregory of Nazianzus, who became bishop of Constantinople and Doctor of the Church. His father, Gregory of Nazianzus the Elder, had been a member of a Jewish-pagan sect called the Hypsistarians, but was converted to Christianity and became Bishop of Nazianzus.

The bishopric is included in the lists of titular sees of Catholic Church with metropolitan status and of the Eastern Orthodox Church.

== See also ==
- Caesarius of Nazianzus
- Gregory of Nazianzus the Elder
- Gregory of Nazianzus
- Cappadocian Fathers
- St. Nazianz, Wisconsin
