= Saint Macarius =

Saint Macarius may refer to:

- Macarius of Egypt, also known as "Macarius the Great" or "Macarius the Elder" 4th-century Egyptian monk
- Macarius of Alexandria (d. 395), Egyptian ascetic, known as "Macarius the Younger"
- Macarius of Jerusalem, 4th-century Bishop of Jerusalem
- Saint Machar, 6th-century Irish saint
- Macarius of Unzha, 15th-century Russian monk
- Macarius-Symeon (949-1022), also known as "Pseudo-Macarius"
- Macarius, Metropolitan of Moscow (1482–1563)
