= Macarius of Egypt =

Egyptian Christian monk and hermit

Saint Macarius of Egypt
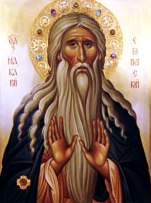
- An icon of Saint Macarius of Egypt

Venerable Monk and Elder
- Born: c. 300 AD; Shabsheer (Shanshour), Roman Egypt
- Died: 391 AD; Scetes, Roman Egypt
- Venerated in: Oriental Orthodox Church; Eastern Orthodox Church; Catholic Church
- Major shrine: Monastery of Saint Macarius the Great, Scetes, Egypt
- Feast: 15 January (West, Roman Catholic); 19 January (Eastern Orthodox); 27 Paremhat (5 April) (Oriental Orthodox)

Macarius of Egypt (Note: Ancient Greek: Ὅσιος Μακάριος ὁ Αἰγύπτιος, Osios Makarios o Egyptios; Coptic: ⲁⲃⲃⲁ ⲙⲁⲕⲁⲣⲓ.) (c. 300 AD – 391 AD) was an Egyptian Christian monk and grazer hermit. He is also known as Macarius the Elder or Macarius the Great.

== Life ==
Macarius was born in Lower Egypt. A late tradition places his birthplace in the village of Shabsheer (Shanshour), Roman Egypt around 300 AD. He tended cattle as a boy. As a young man, with a strong call to solitude, he constructed near his home a small cell where he prayed continually and wove mats. At some point before his pursuit of asceticism, Macarius made his living smuggling saltpeter in the vicinity of Nitria, a vocation which taught him how to survive in and travel across the wastes in that area.

Macarius is known for his wisdom. His friends and close kin used to call him Paidarion Geron (Ancient Greek: Παιδάριον Γέρων, which when compounded as Paidiogeron led to Coptic: Ⲡⲓⲇⲁⲣ Ⲓⲟⲩⲅⲉⲣⲟⲛ, Pidar Yougiron) which meant the "old young man", i.e. "the young man with the elders' wisdom."

At the wish of his parents Macarius entered into marriage, but was soon widowed. Shortly after, his parents died as well. Macarius subsequently distributed all his money among the poor and needy. He found a teacher in an experienced Elder, who lived in the desert not far from the village. The Elder accepted the youth, guided him in the spiritual science of watchfulness, fasting and prayer, and taught him the handicraft of weaving baskets.

A while later, a pregnant woman accused him of having defiled her. Macarius did not attempt to defend himself, and accepted the accusation in silence. However, when the woman's delivery drew near, her labor became exceedingly difficult. She did not manage to give birth until she confessed Macarius's innocence. A multitude of people then came asking for his forgiveness, but he fled to the Nitrian Desert to escape all mundane glory.

As a hermit, Macarius spent seven years living on only pulse and raw herbs. He spent the following three years consuming four or five ounces of bread a day and only one vessel of oil a year. While at the desert, he visited Anthony the Great and learned from him the laws and rules of monasticism. When he returned to the Scetic Desert at the age of forty, he became a priest. The fame of his sanctity drew many followers. The community, which took up its residence in the desert, was of the semi-eremitical type. The monks were not bound by any fixed rule; their cells were close together, and they met for Divine worship only on Saturdays or Sundays. He presided over this monastic community for the rest of his life.

For a brief period of time, Macarius was banished to an island in the Nile by the Emperor Valens, along with Macarius of Alexandria, during a dispute over the doctrine of the Nicene Creed. Both men were victims of religious persecution by the followers of then Bishop Lucius of Alexandria. During their time on the island, the daughter of a pagan priest had become ill. The people of the island believed that she was possessed by an evil spirit. Both saints prayed over the daughter, which in turn had saved her. The pagan people of the island were so impressed and grateful that they stopped their worship of the pagan gods and built a church. When word of this got back to the Emperor Valens and Bishop Lucius of Alexandria, they quickly allowed both men to return home. At their return on 13 Paremhat, they were met by a multitude of monks of the Nitrian Desert, numbered fifty thousand, among whom were Pishoy and John the Dwarf.

== Death and relics ==
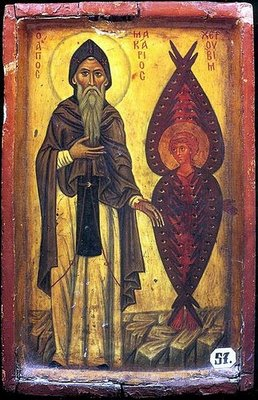
St. Macarius the Great standing next to a Cherub.

Macarius died in the year 391. After his death, the natives of his village of Shabsheer stole the body and built a great church for him in their village. Pope Michael V of Alexandria brought the relics of Saint Macarius back to the Nitrian Desert on 19 Mesori. Today, the body of Macarius is found in his monastery, the Monastery of Saint Macarius the Great in Scetes, Egypt.

== Legacy ==
Macarius is a saint in the Eastern Orthodox, Oriental Orthodox and Roman Catholic churches.

In the Methodist churches, Macarius is regarded highly for writing on the topic of entire sanctification.

Macarius of Egypt founded a monastery that bears his name, the Monastery of Saint Macarius the Great, which has been continuously inhabited by monks since its foundation in the fourth century. St. Macarius’ face used to be enlightened with grace in an amazing way to the extent that many fathers testified that his face used to glow in the dark; and thus appeared his name as “the glowing lantern”. This description was transferred to his monastery, and thus it was called “the glowing lantern of the wilderness” or “the glowing monastery”, which meant the place of high wisdom and constant prayer. Today it belongs to the Coptic Orthodox Church.

The entirety of the Nitrian Desert is sometimes called the Desert of Macarius, for he was the pioneer monk in the region. The ruins of numerous monasteries in this region support the local tradition that the cloisters of Macarius were equal in number to the days of the year.

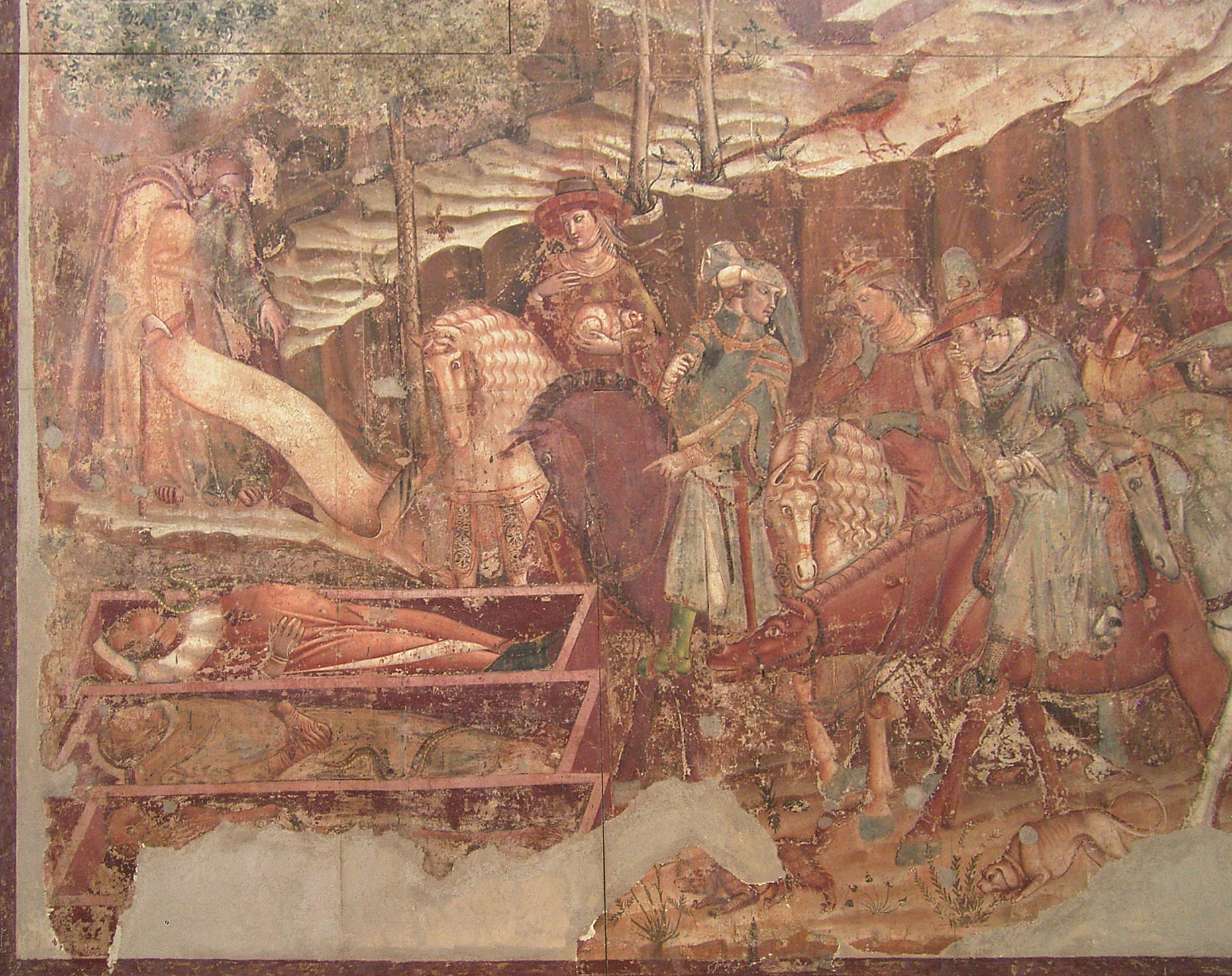
Saint Macarius The Great, Camposanto, Trionfo Della Morte

Macarius the Great, one of the Egyptian desert recluses and a disciple of Anthony the Great, is depicted on the left edge of the Triumph of Death fresco in Pisa. A group of leisurely aristocrats and their animals occupy the central part of the fresco. These rich young men and women riding horses, surrounded by their decorative hunting dogs have gone on a pleasant journey. Suddenly, their path, somewhere deep in the woods, is barred by three open sarcophagi with bodies in different degrees of decomposition. Everybody in the scene, including the men, women and even the animals are horrified by this terrible and palpable presence of death. The unsupportable stench hits their noses. The abhorrent scene dismays them. Only Macarius the Great, made wise and powerful by his faith, stands above them all. The mystic teaches the youngsters a lesson about life and death by reading from the scroll. The Florentine sculptor Benvenuto Cellini was inspired by this depiction of Macarius in his painted portrait.

== See also ==
- Pseudo-Macarius
