= Portraits of Benvenuto Cellini =

There are a number of portraits of the Italian goldsmith and sculptor Benvenuto Cellini (1500–1570), including possible self-portraits and portraits by other artists. Details about Cellini's physical appearance come largely from portraits made during his lifetime. However, because in the 17th–20th century, artists drew Cellini's features from imagination or from images that had been misidentified, there is a lack of consensus regarding images of the artist.

== Contemporary portraits of Cellini ==
=== Portrait of Cellini in the Vasari Fresco ===
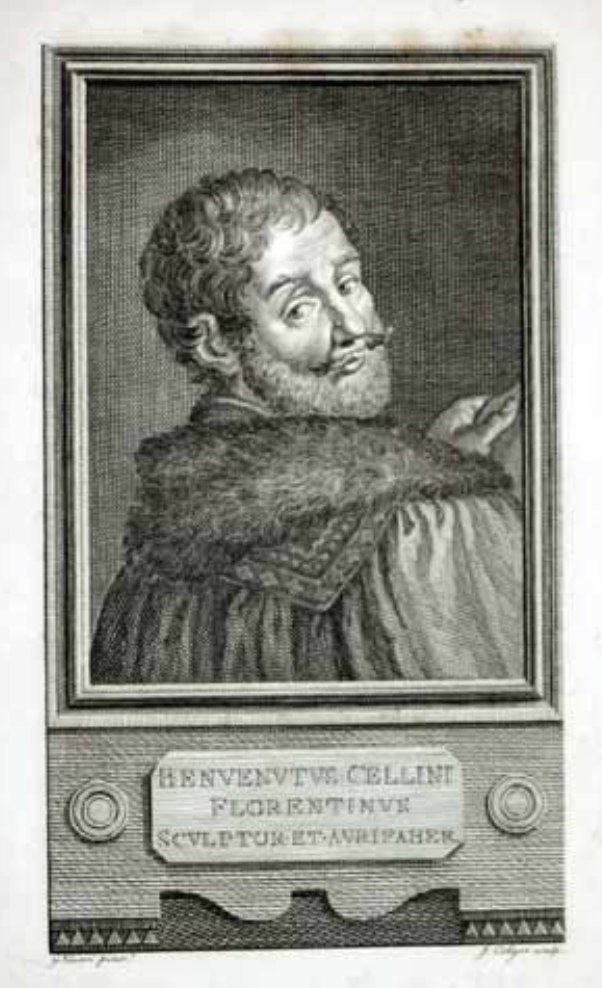
Collyer, Joseph, A portrait of Benvenuto Cellini. Engraving. 26.5 cm by 14 cm. (1771) National Library, Vienna. Inventory number 8191345

A portrait of Cellini appears among other court artists of the Florentine Duke Cosimo I de' Medici in a round fresco (tondo) by Giorgio Vasari in the Palazzo Vecchio in 1563. Under the picture of the already aging Cellini is the caption, "Benvenuto SCVL".

All the personalities shown on the tondo were recognizable during Vasari's time. There are 11 individuals portrayed on the tondo. Giorgio Vasari mentioned nine of them in his written comments and inscriptions located on the right of the fresco: Tribolo (Niccolo di Raffaello di Nicolo dei Pericoli), Tasso (Giovanni Battista del Tasso), Nanni Unghero, San Marino, Giorgio Vasari, Baccio Bandinelli, Bartolomeo Ammanati, Benvenuto Cellini and Francesco Di ser Jacopo. Giorgio Vasari failed to mention only one of his colleagues: Luca Martini.

=== Portrait of Bartolomeo Ammanatti, wrongly attributed as portrait of Cellini ===
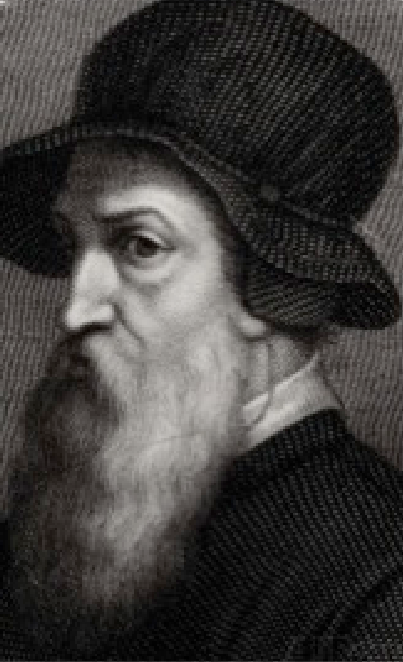
Morghen, Raffaello (1758–1883) A portrait of Benvenuto Cellini. Engraving (1822)

In 1891, French publisher Eugene Plon called into question the identification of individuals in the Vasari fresco, which had been accepted since the 16th century. Although most of the figures, including Cellini himself, appear in the fresco signed by Vasari with their real names, Plon nevertheless cast doubt on the caption's accuracy. Plon claimed in his book that "the real" Cellini in the fresco is the man who would later be identified as Bartolomeo Ammannati. Studies made in 1971 reaffirmed the original identification of the figures in the tondo.

=== Portrait of Giorgio Vasari (wrongly attributed as portrait of Cellini) ===
By the end of the 18th century, another portrait, identified as Cellini, was taken from the fresco in the Palazzo Vecchio. This version was by the British artist and engraver Joseph Collyer (1748 –1827). In 1829 Francesco Tassi claimed that Collyer had been commissioned to make the engraving of "portrait Benvenuto Cellini" by the British publisher "Nugent". Looking for the correct face of Benvenuto, the English artist relied on Cellini's image in Vasari's tondo. But Collyer simply failed to properly identify the artist among the other figures in the fresco. He erroneously thought that Cellini was the man placed at the very bottom of the tondo. Collyer's Cellini was the man shown talking to Francesco di Ser Jacopo, and looking over his shoulder towards the viewer. In other words, the British master created "A Portrait of Benvenuto Cellini" in 1771, as a portrait of the painting's author Giorgio Vasari, and not actually of Cellini.

=== Portrait of Cellini by Raffaello Morghen ===
Two and a half centuries after Vasari's tondo was painted, the Italian artist Raffaello Sanzio Morghen (1758–1833) used the portrait in the fresco at the Palazzo Vecchio as a sample for his engraved "Portrait of Benvenuto Cellini". Morghen's picture was largely propagated by publishers of the time. These days the work of Raffaello Sanzio Morghen and its derivatives remain Cellini's best-known and most widely reproduced image.

== Possible self-portraits of Cellini ==
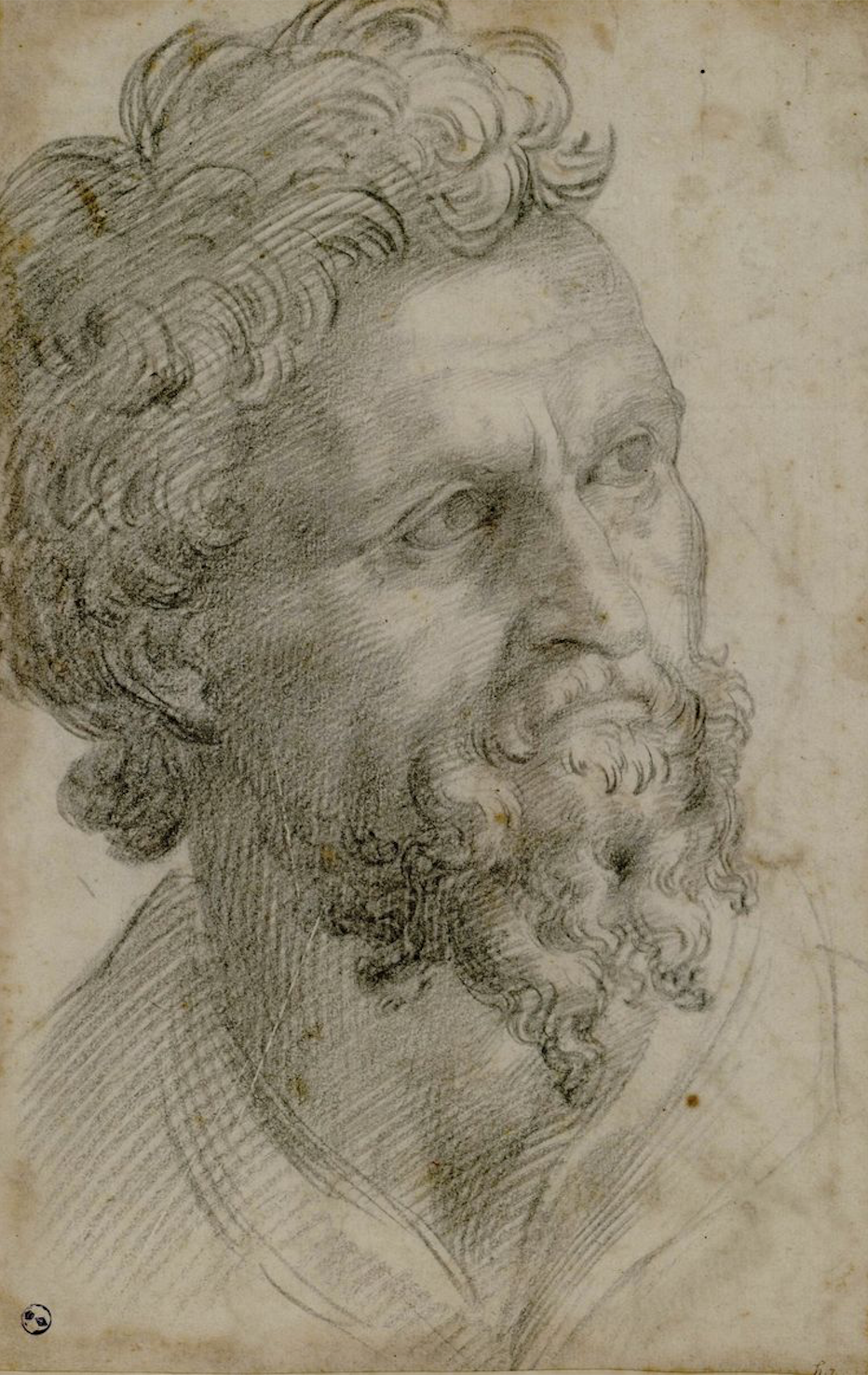
Benvenuto Cellini, Self-Portrait (1540–1543 (?) Royal Library, Turin)

=== Self-portrait on a sketch from the Royal Library in Turin ===
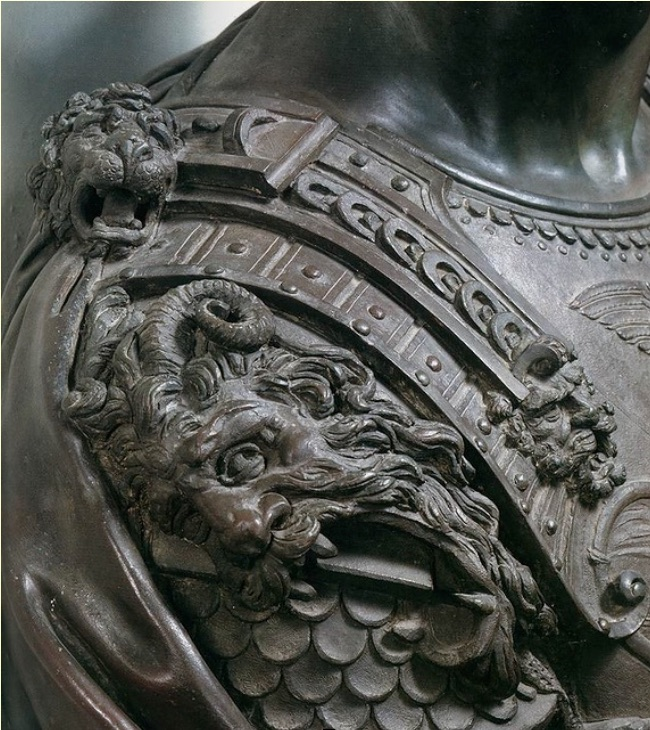
Benvenuto Cellini, Bust of Cosimo I. (1545, bronze)

The Royal Library of Turin (Biblioteca Reale di Torino) has two sketches of Cellini drawn on both sides of one sheet of paper measuring 28.3 cm by 18.5 cm. One side of the paper bears a graphite, which is identified as the self-portrait. Several autographs in Cellini's own hand accompany the drawing; and among the notes is a date reading: "July 21, 1559".

=== Self-portrait on the bust of Cosimo I Medici ===
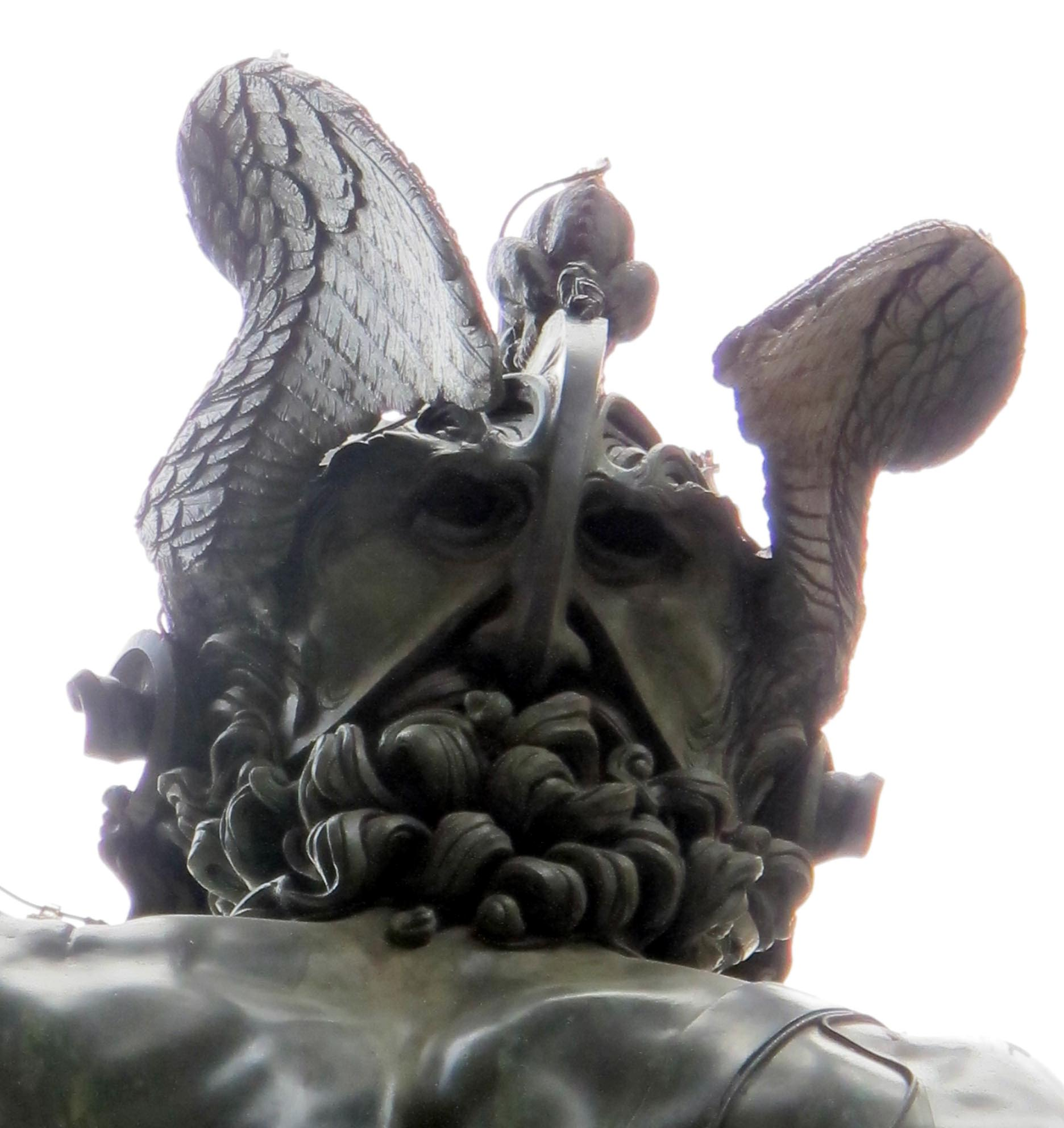
Benvenuto Cellini. Perseus. (detail, 1543) Loggia dei Lanzi, Florence.

Upon his return from France to his hometown Florence in 1545, Cellini cast a bronze bust of Cosimo I Medici, the Grand Duke of Tuscany. The decorative head located on the right shoulder of this bust is a self-portrait of Cellini, composed with elements of a satyr, lion and a man. The lion, part of the grotesque image on the bust, alludes to Cellini himself. By presenting himself in the guise of a satyr, Cellini alludes to his own nickname "Diablo". Dr. Pope Hennessy suggests that the horns on the Duke's armor may hint at Cosmo de' Medici's zodiac sign, Capricorn.

=== Self-portrait on Perseus sculpture ===
A possible self-portrait is said to appear on the sculpture of Perseus in the Loggia dei Lanzi in Florence. The back side of the head of Perseus is said to be Cellini's self-portrait. An inscription bearing the words "TE FILI SIQUIS LAESERIT ULTOR ERO" is carved on the marble cartouche beneath Jupiter's niche on the base of Cellini's "Perseus".

== Later portraits of Cellini ==
=== Portrait of Benvenuto Cellini on porphyry stone ===
The French 19th-century editor Eugene Plon, besides mistakenly attempting to re-attribute personages of Vasari's fresco in Palazzo Vecchio, wrote about a "porphyry portrait of Benvenuto Cellini".

M. Eugene Piotte obliged us very much by handing to us [for study] a portrait made on porphyry, which has the following inscription on the reverse side made in silver letters: "Benvenuto Cellini, nato di Giovani di Andra e di Maria Lisabetta di Stefano Granacci, il di d'Ognissanti nel 1500"

Today it is in the National Museum of Renaissance in Château d’Ecouen, France, but is presently attributed to Francesco Salviati.

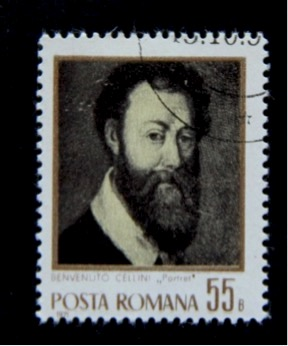
Stamp portraying "Benvenuto Cellini" issued in Romania for Benvenuto Cellini's 400th year death anniversary.

Plon dates the 8,5 cm medallion to the first half of the 16th century and he believes that the piece is the exact depiction of the "portrait of messer Benvenuto in nut-wood frame", which in accordance with the notary public's evidence, hung on a wall in the goldsmith's house at the moment of Benvenuto death. Plon claims that "several portraits made on porphyritic stone are kept in the Pitti Gallery" and that "all of them date back to the same epoch as regards the time of their creation." However, scholars disprove this claim. The data available nowadays suggests that only two portraits on porphyry ever existed. One of them shows the so-called "Benvenuto Cellini" and the other one, "Ferdinando I Medici".

In 1971, The State Post of Romania issued a stamp in occasion of the 400th anniversary since Cellini's death. The "porphyry portrait" was chosen as the basis for the stamp. Although in 2007, the Parisian auction house "Drouot" sold a picture attributed as "Portrait of Monsieur Strozzi" by an unknown follower of Cornelius de Lion. This picture is signed.

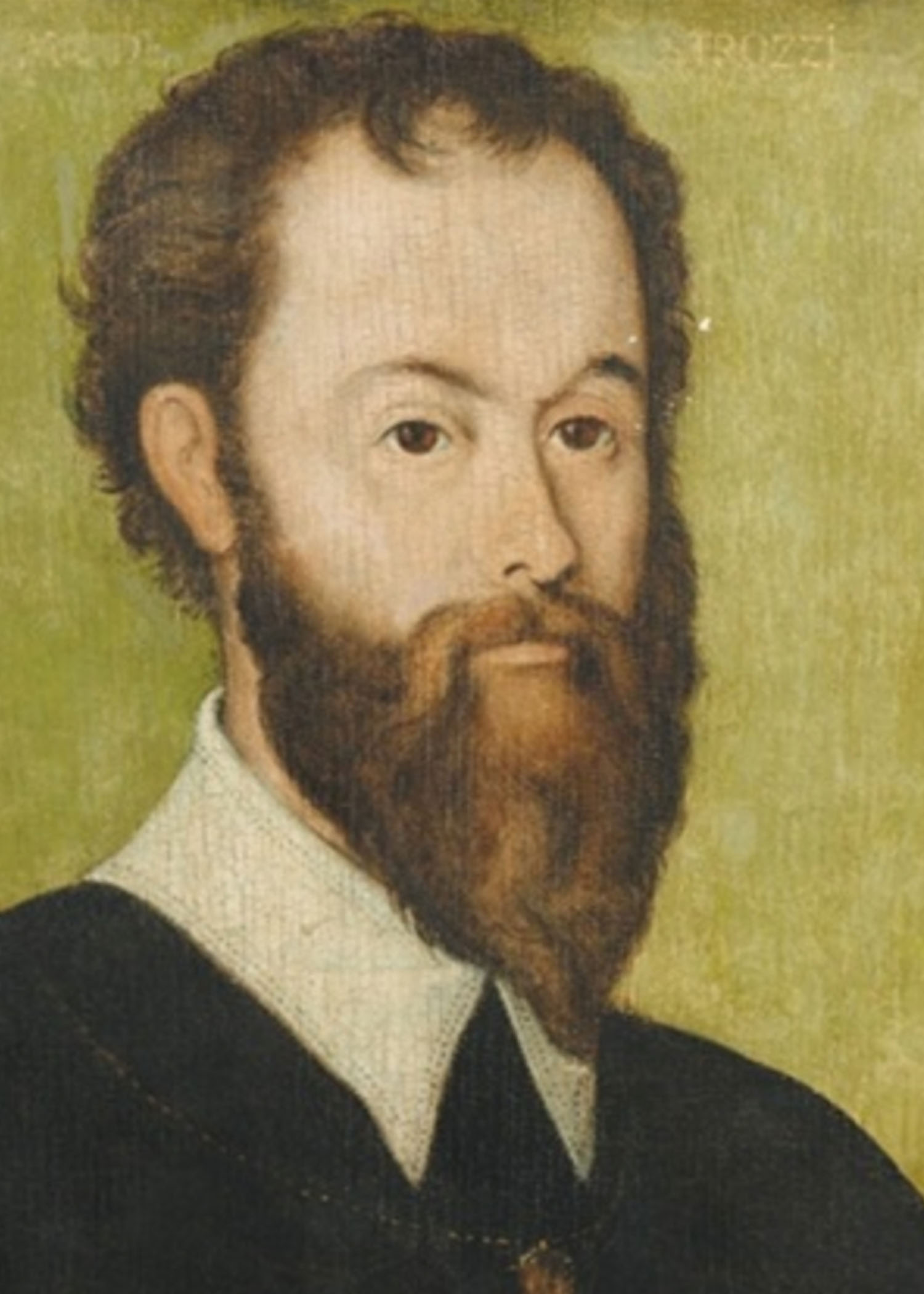
Picture sold by the Drouot auction house in 2007 identified as being a portrait of "Monsieur Strozzi" by an unknown follower of Cornelius De Lion.

The inscription identifies the sitter as "Monsieur Strozzi". "Monsieur Strozzi" and "Benvenuto Cellini" are therefore portrayed as being the same person.

=== Portrait of Cellini by Zocchi-Allegrini ===
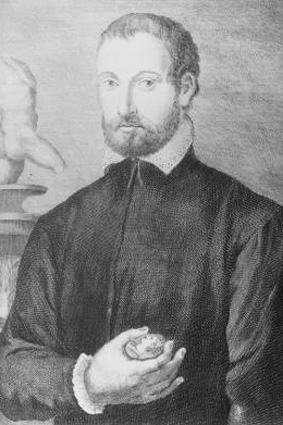
Allegrini, Francesco. ‘Portrait of Benvenuto Cellini’. Engraving. 29.5 cm х19.2 cm. From a sketch by Giuseppe Zocchi. Austrian Nationalbibliothek

A re-discovery of Cellini's book by the public at the end of the 18th century brought up an acute need for the portrait of the author, in order to illustrate the publications. Many artists and engravers received orders from the publishers to produce Cellini's images. The earliest sample of the portraits of the "new wave" was an engraving made by the Italian master Francesco Allegrini in 1762. Allegrini used a drawing of Giuseppe Zocchi as the basis for this work. (1711–1767).

It is not known what sources Giuseppe Zocchi used in his work for the inspiration, but the image of "Cellini" he created stands very wide apart from the portrait of Benvenuto on Vasari's fresco. The Allegrini/Zocchi print was purchased by Louis-Philippe, (that time the Duke of Orleans, and later became the King of France) for his collection. At present, a copy of ‘Portrait of Benvenuto Cellini’ of Zocchi/Allegrini is kept at the Palace of Versailles and Trianon.

== Cellini in other works ==
=== Sculpture by Jean-Jacque Feuchere ===
French sculptor Jean-Jacques Feuchere (1807–1852) cast the small bronze sculpture "Cellini" in 1837. This portrait bears some similarity with the personage on the Vasari tondo. Feuchere, Jean-Jacques. Benvenuto Cellini, Bronze. (1837)

=== The Marrel Brothers Cup ===
King of France Louis-Philippe purchased the Marrel Brothers Cup in order to hand this work of art to his son Louis, Duke of Nemours as a gift. The event occurred in 1839 during an industrial exhibition in Paris.

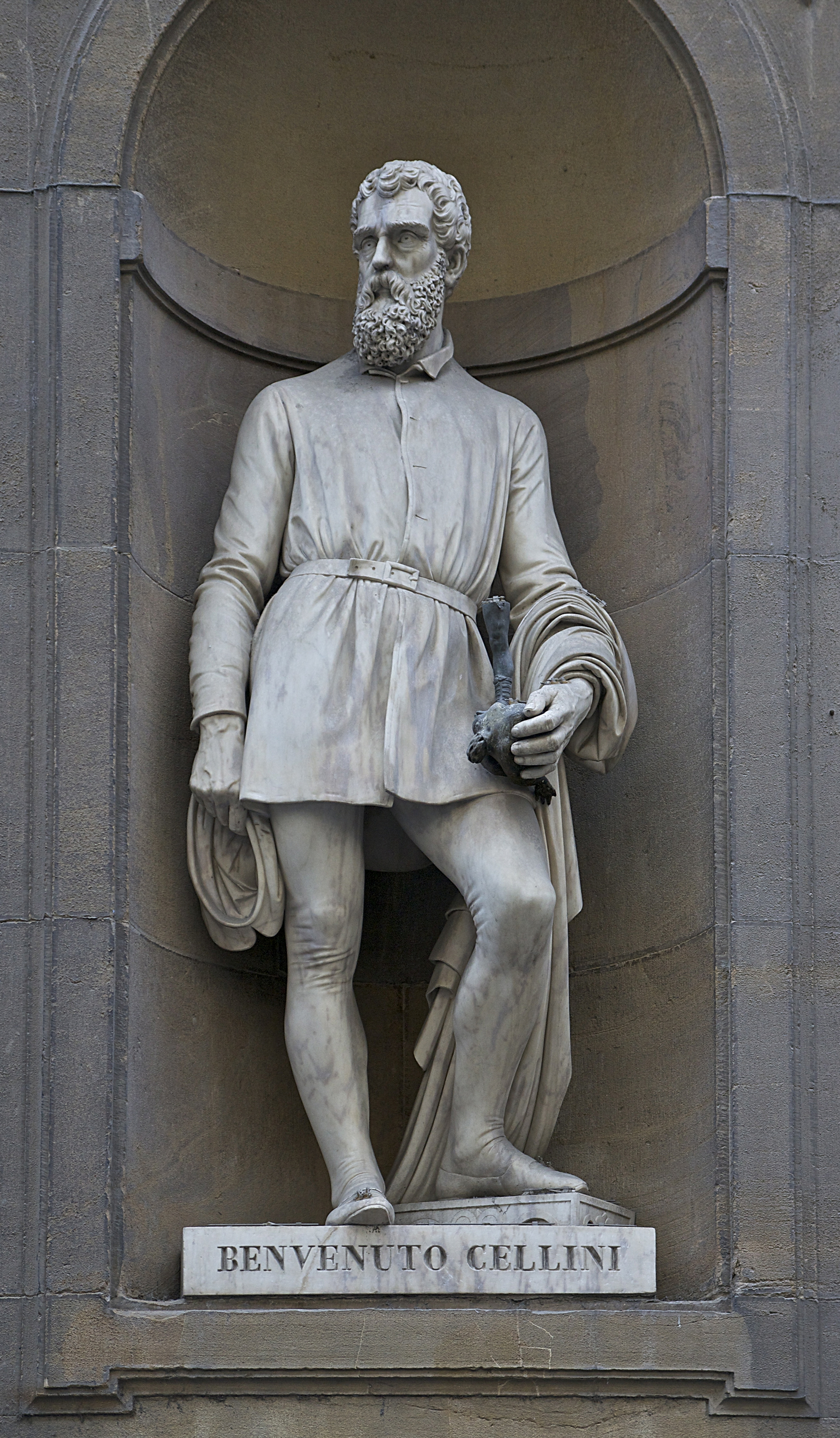
Much later statue of Cellini, Piazzale degli Uffizi, Florence, Cambi.

Goldsmiths and companions Antoine-Benoit-Roch and Jean-Pierre-Nazaire Marrel produced their masterpiece on a wave of inspiration from Cellini's so-called "Augsburg's Cup" that was purchased by the Louvre Museum in 1832. The latter cup had the form of a silver chalice with gilding. The authorship of the "Augsburg's cup"was attributed to Benvenuto at that time. The Marrel Brothers were impressed by the events and responded with their own creation.

=== Bust by Vincenzo Gajassi ===
The Italian sculptor Vincenzo di Marco Fabio Apolloni (‘Gajassi’) created a marble bust of Cellini in 1844. Later in the same year, Lady Eleonora Butler presented the marble as a gift to the Museum Capitoline in Rome. The master apparently tried to impart features found on the Vasari fresco in Palazzo Vecchio to his model. Proof is found in the characteristic long beard, as well as in the shape of the nose, eyebrows and half-face. Apolloni, Vincenzo di Marco Fabio. 'Bust of Benvenuto Cellini'. Marble. (1844). Museum Capitoline, Rome

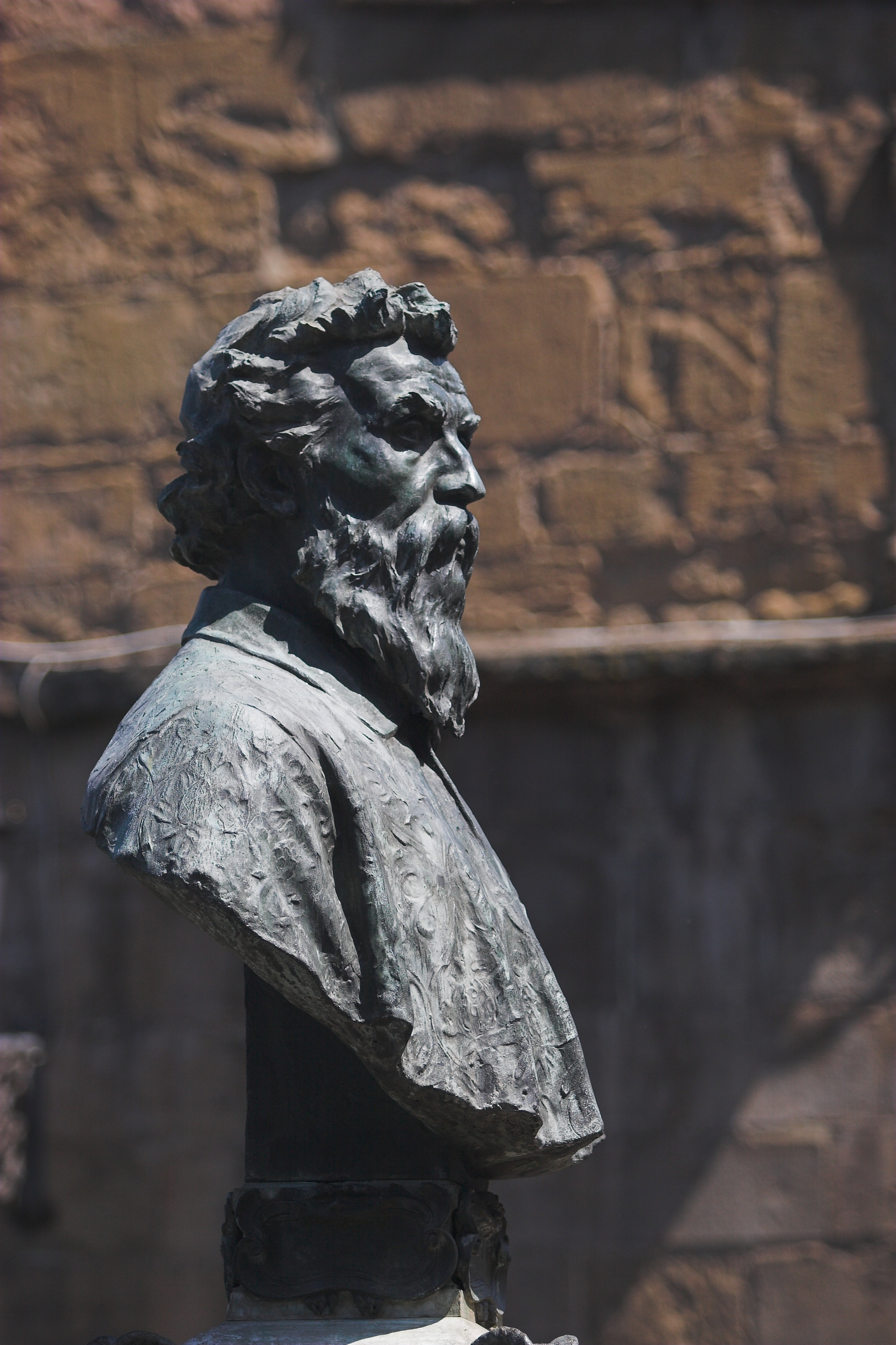
Romanelli Raffaello. ‘Bust of Benvenuto Cellini’. (1900). Ponto Vecchio, Florence

=== Sculpture by Ulisse Cambi ===
The architect Giorgio Vasari and his successor Bernardo Buontoletti left 28 spare niches in the walls of colonnade of the Uffizi palace. A portrait of Benvenuto Cellini made by Ulisse Cambi (1807–1895) was installed in one of the niches. A marble statue more than 3 meters tall was unveiled to the public the 24th of June in 1845.

The portrait is entirely the plot of Cambi's imagination. His interpretation of Cellini's image and sculpture as a whole triggered sharp criticism from the public.

=== Bust by Raffaello Romanelli ===
Raffaello Romanelli’s bust of Benvenuto Cellini was placed in the middle of the Old Bridge (Ponte Vecchio) in Florence in 1901. Romanelli had given his own facial traits to Cellini's bust on Ponte Vecchio.
