= Cellini Salt Cellar =

Sculpture by Benvenuto Cellini

Coordinates: 48.2036°N 16.3619°E

- Saliera (Italian)
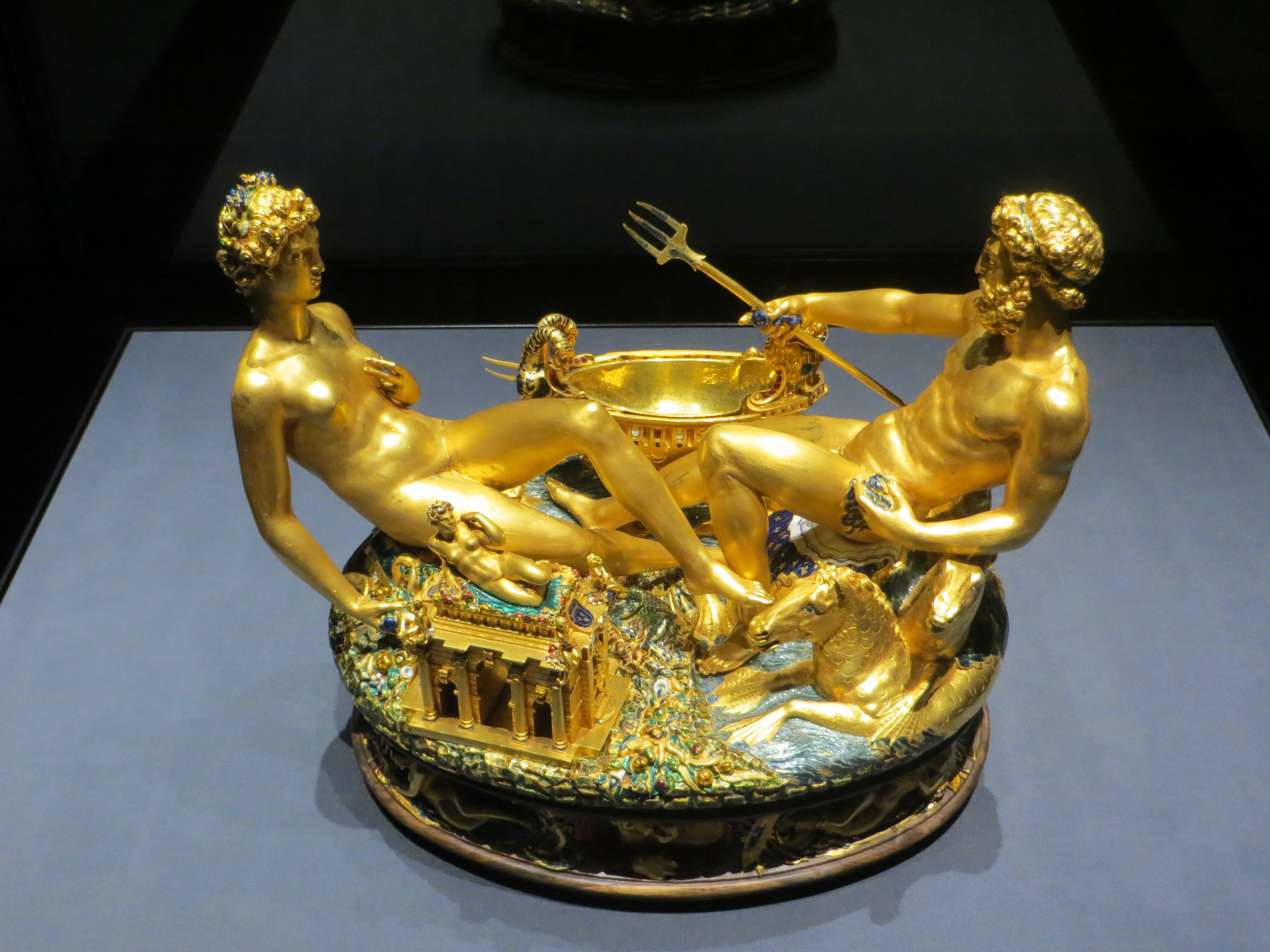
- Artist: Benvenuto Cellini
- Year: 1543
- Type: Partly enameled gold sculpture
- Dimensions: 26.3 cm × 28.5 cm (10.4 in × 11.2 in)
- Location: Kunsthistorisches Museum, Vienna, Vienna
- Accession: 881
- Website: https://www.khm.at/en/artworks/saliera-87080-1

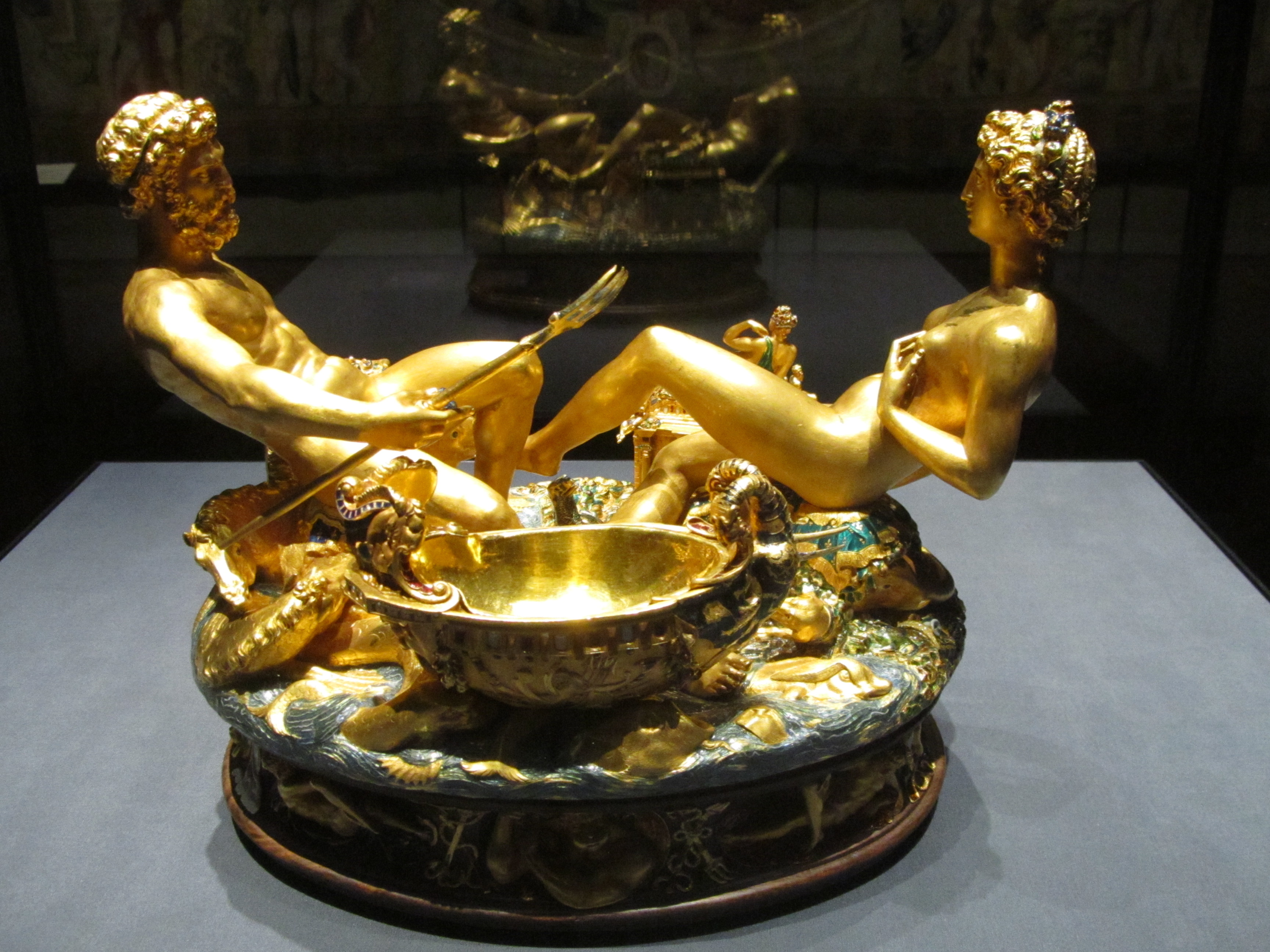
The Saliera

The Cellini Salt Cellar (in Vienna called the Saliera, Italian for salt cellar) is a part-enamelled gold table sculpture by Benvenuto Cellini (c.1500–1571). It was completed in 1543 for Francis I of France (r.1515–1547), from silver plate models that had been prepared many years earlier for Cardinal Ippolito d'Este (c.1479–1520).

Functioning as more than just an expensive condiment holder, the cellar aimed to catapult conversation among intellectuals on the underlying meanings of the work. During the Renaissance, the Saliera was notable for its Mannerism. The main draw is the work's style and form, which Cellini discusses in his treatise, I trattati dell'oreficieria e della Scultura (Treatises on Goldsmithing and Sculpture) and in his autobiography. The work is the only extant gold sculpture by Benvenuto Cellini and is most famous of extant gold sculpture work to survive from the Renaissance. Ultimately, acting as a paradigm for 'renaissance gold smithery,' the sculptor showcased the multifaceted meanings of small objects of the era.

Famously stolen in 2003, the salt cellar was recovered in 2006 and the thief was imprisoned.

== Historical context, commission, and technique ==
Benvenuto Cellini entered the service of Cardinal Ippolito d'Este in Rome who encouraged Cellini to make larger and bolder pieces. He then worked for many prominent figures in his career, including King Francis I of France (r. 1515–1547), and later in Florence for the Medici ruler Duke Cosimo I (r.1537–1569). While living at the French King's court, Cellini made the salt cellar, along with the assistance of five other artists (two from Italy, two from France, and one artist from Germany). Cellini reported in his Vita that the price for the completed sculpture was 1,000 scudi. Many other Renaissance goldsmithery works, including several made by Cellini (known to us solely because of his descriptions in his autobiography), were melted down. This piece was almost melted down and destroyed in 1562, but managed to avoid the fate of so many other gold sculptures from the Italian Renaissance.

Cellini's overall technique in designing the salt cellar for King Francis I stemmed from methods that he learned from Caradosso (Cristoforo Foppa). He noticed that Caradosso would "make a little model in wax of the size he wished his work to be." Eager to make an art piece more grand and dissimilar than Caradosso's, Cellini utilized the idea of making a wax model. The end product was based on a model that Cellini had originally created for Ippolito d'Este. The Cellar was not only magnificently crafted, but it also served an important political role for Frances I and his court in the 1540s. The Saliera was designed to be the artistic symbol of the French king's domestic and international policies. The substantial power of the court is demonstrated through access to rare condiments such as pepper that had been of great interest to Europeans.

== Description, symbolism, and interpretation ==
The salt cellar is made of gold, vitreous enamel, ebony and ivory. The gold is not cast in a mold, but instead hammered by hand into its delicate shape. It stands about 10.5 in (267 mm) inches tall with a base about 13.1 in (333 mm) inches wide and features bearings to roll it around on a banquet table.

Created in the Mannerist style of the late Renaissance, Cellini's Salt Cellar allegorically portrays Terra e Mare (Land and Sea). Both subjects reflect the influence of Mannerism in their enigmatic facial expressions, inaccurate body proportions, and use of contrapposto. Moreover, the style popular in Florentine courts inspired Cellini as well: the sumptuous material of gold and enamel, the female figure's relatively slender proportions, attention to details, and the mastery of execution. Depicted in the nude, the two central figures juxtapose one another, seemingly confronting each other face-to-face. The sea is representative of the male figure, Neptune, reclining beside a ship that functioned as a salt holder. The figure wields a trident in his right hand, while encompassed by sea horses, fish, shells, and other sea creatures that symbolize his godly connection with the ocean. The animals utilized in this work functioned as common iconographic symbols of antiquity.

The earth, embodied by the female figure, Tellus, is depicted alongside a temple that serves as a receptacle for pepper. In contrast with Neptune, Tellus caresses her breast as a symbol of fertility emitting, "plenty adorned with all the beauties of the world." The horn she carries in her draped right hand signifies her association with nature, while simultaneously showcasing her "fertility" and "wealth." The temple beneath her arm is designed to house the pepper.

In the oval-shaped base of the sculpture, Cellini included four gold figures representing the times of day that were inspired by Michelangelo's allegorical figures of Day and Night, and Dawn and Dusk, in the Medici Chapel in the church of San Lorenzo in Florence. Alongside the times of day are the primary winds. Signifying these winds of the cardinal direction are male youths located on the base, they are shown with expanded cheeks in the act of blowing billows of air. Fire is symbolized by the salamander located underneath the heel of Tellus' left foot, which was the personal emblem of Francis I. Cellini further added more allegorical motifs to represent the court such as the king's coat of arms, an elephant, and lilies. In the end, the classical elements—earth, water, air and fire—are all showcased in the work. Moreover, the sculpture was designed to illustrate the all-encompassing order of the cosmos and of the small microcosm of the world.

== Provenance ==
The cellar came into the possession of the Habsburgs as a gift by Charles IX of France to Archduke Ferdinand II of Tyrol, who had acted as a proxy for Charles in his wedding to Elisabeth of Austria.

Originally, the cellar was part of the Habsburg art collection at Castle Ambras, but was transferred to the Kunsthistorisches Museum in Vienna during the 19th century.

== Theft and recovery ==
On 11 May 2003, the cellar was stolen from the Kunsthistorisches Museum, which was covered by scaffolding at that time due to reconstruction works. The thief set off the alarms, but these were ignored as false, and the theft remained undiscovered until 8:20 am. The museum offered a reward of €1,000,000 for its recovery. The cellar was recovered on 21 January 2006, buried in a lead box in a forest near the town of Zwettl, Austria, about 90 km north of Vienna. The thief, Robert Mang, turned himself in after police released surveillance photos of the suspect which were subsequently recognized by acquaintances. Mang was sentenced to 4 years in prison for the theft. The sculpture is insured for an estimated $60 million (approx. $68.3 million in CPI-adjusted 2012 United States dollars) by Uniqa Insurance Group, an Austrian insurance company.
