= Young River God with Three Putti =

Sculpture by Pierino da Vinci

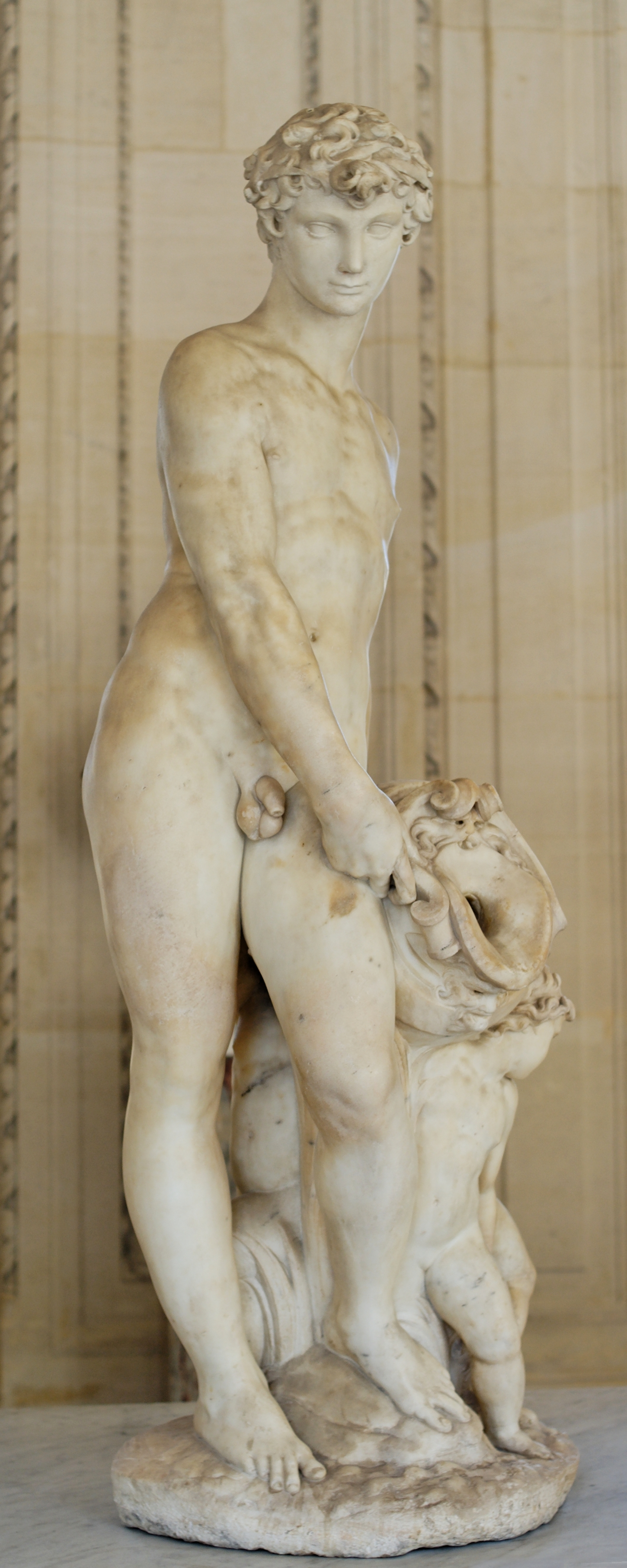
- Artist: Pierino da Vinci
- Year: 1548
- Medium: Marble
- Dimensions: 1.36 m (54 in)
- Location: Louvre, Paris

The Young River God with Three Putti is a marble sculpture of about 1548 by the Mannerist artist Pierino da Vinci (c. 1529 – 1553/1554), now in the Musée du Louvre in Paris. The 1.36 m (4 ft 6 in)–high sculpture shows a pensive young river god accompanied by three laughing putti carrying an urn.

The work has been attributed to other sculptors, including Michelangelo and Gian Lorenzo Bernini, but by 1928 it was securely attributed to Pierino da Vinci, the nephew of Leonardo da Vinci, based on a description of the work by Giorgio Vasari. Vasari recounts that it was commissioned by the Medici official and patron of the arts Luca Martini. Martini presented the work to Eleanor of Toledo, the wife of Cosimo I de' Medici, Grand Duke of Tuscany. She in turn gave it to her brother, García Álvarez de Toledo y Osorio, who put it in the gardens of Santa Chiara, Naples. The statue was then at the Palazzo Balzo, also in Naples. It was acquired by Baron Basile de Schlichting, a Russian émigré residing in Paris, who on his death in August 1914 left the sculpture along with the rest of his collection to the Louvre.

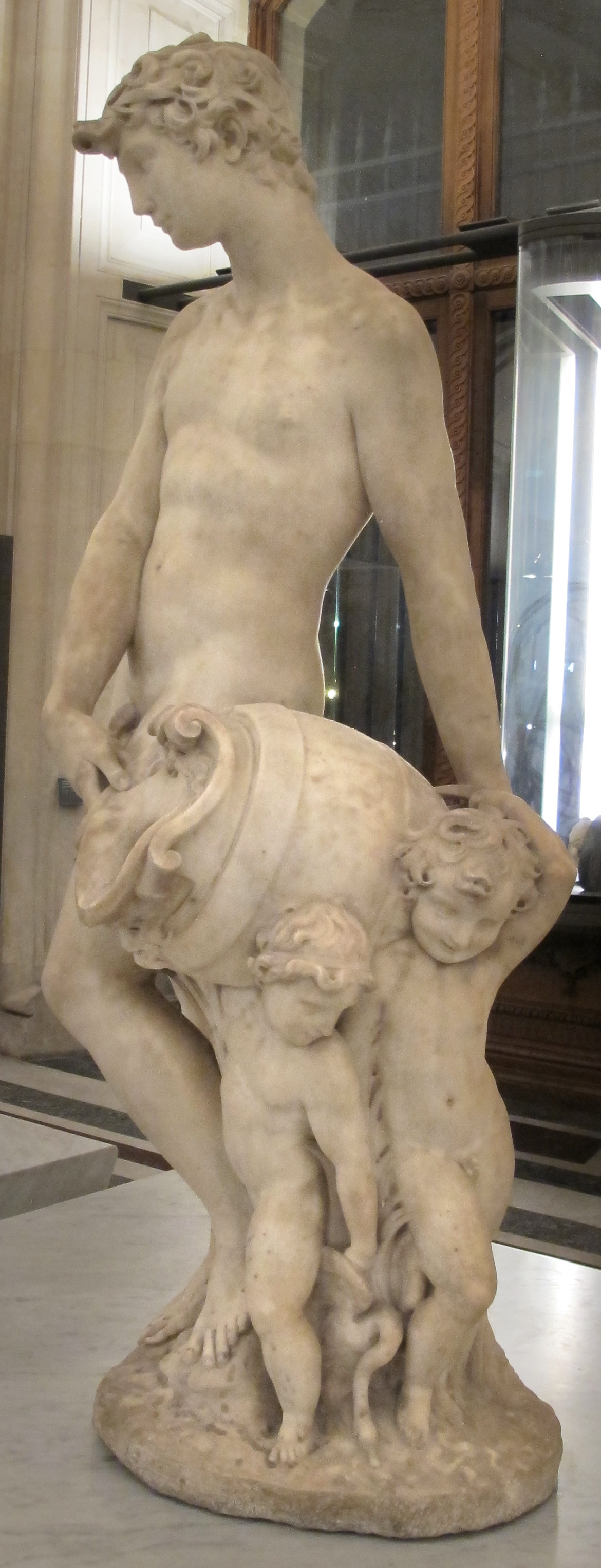
Side view, with two putti and goose

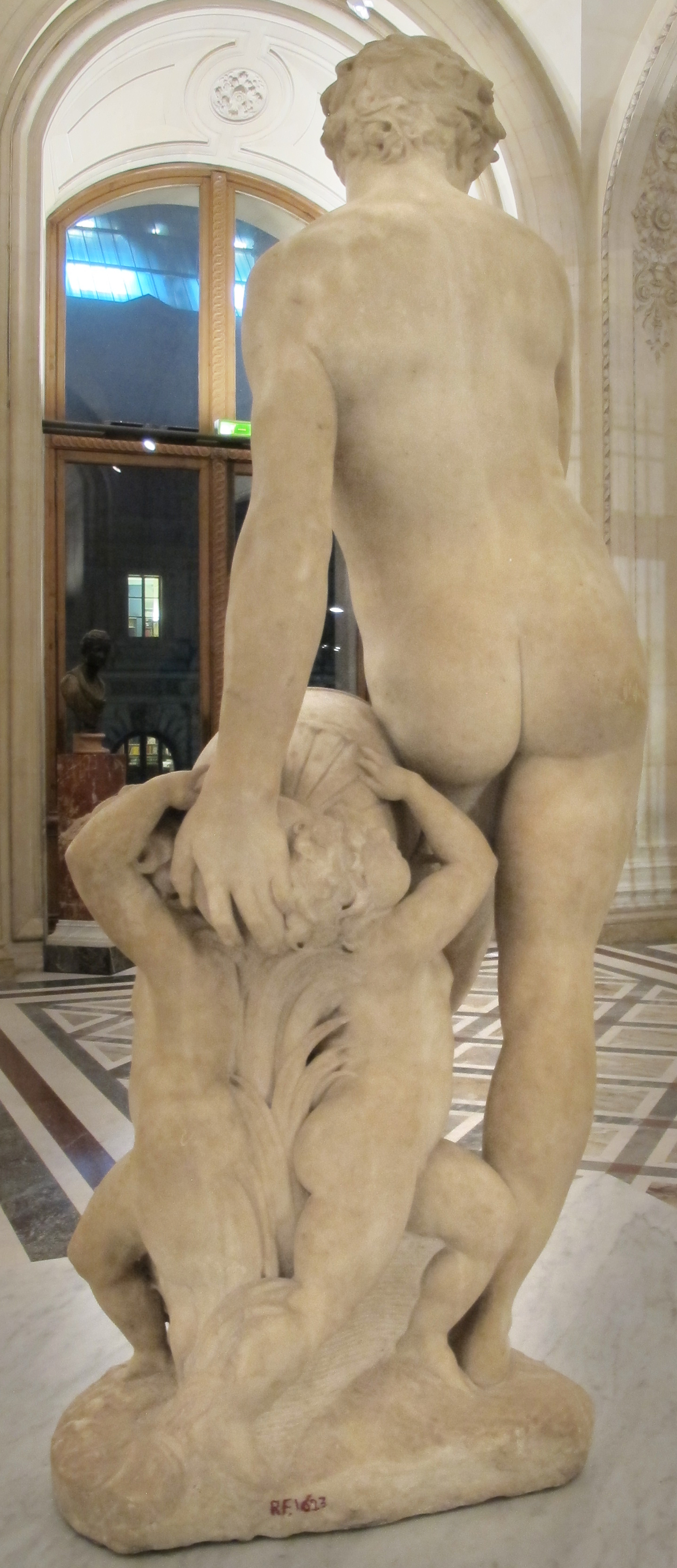
Rear, with third putto
