= Six Tuscan Poets =

Painting by Giorgio Vasari

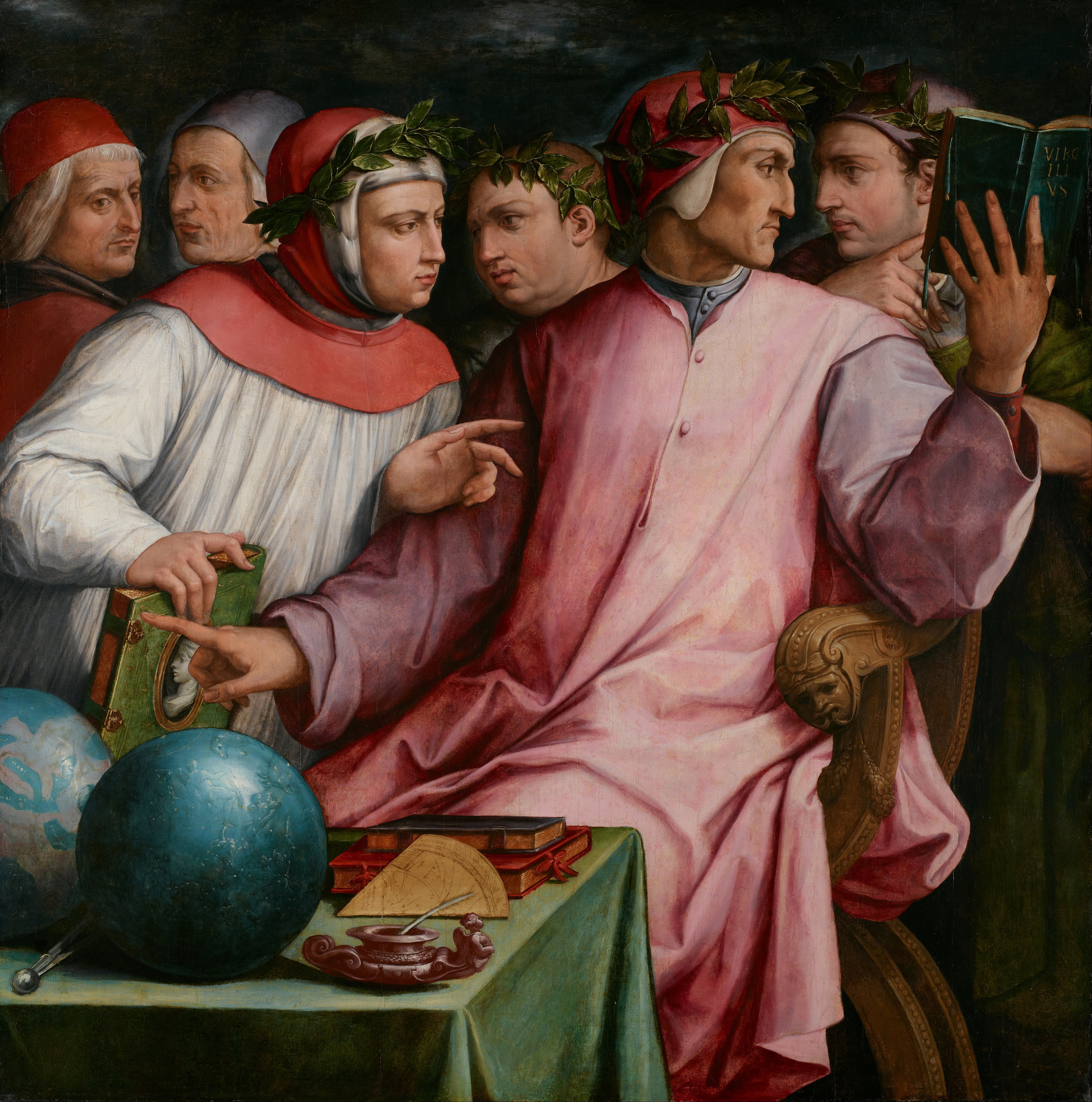
- Artist: Giorgio Vasari
- Year: 1544
- Medium: Oil on panel
- Dimensions: 132.1 cm × 131.1 cm (52.0 in × 51.6 in)
- Location: Minneapolis Institute of Art, Minneapolis

Six Tuscan Poets is an oil-on-panel painting by the Florentine visual artist and writer Giorgio Vasari, created in 1544. The poets depicted in the painting from left to right are Guittone d'Arezzo, Cino da Pistoia, Petrarch, Giovanni Boccaccio, Dante Alighieri, and Guido Cavalcanti. In 2021 it was lent to the Metropolitan Museum of Art, in New York, for the exhibition The Medici: Portraits and Politics, 1512–1570.

The work was commissioned from Vasari by the Tuscan arts patron Luca Martini.

Today the painting is in the permanent collection of the Minneapolis Institute of Art.
