= Peter II of Alexandria =

Head of the Coptic Church from 373 to 381

Saint Peter II of Alexandria
- Patriarch of Alexandria
- Papacy began: 373
- Papacy ended: 381
- Predecessor: Athanasius the Apostolic
- Successor: Timothy I

Personal details
- Born: Egypt
- Died: 27 February 381 Egypt
- Buried: Dominicium, Alexandria
- Residence: Saint Mark's Church

Sainthood
- Feast day: 27 February (20 Amshir in the Coptic calendar)

Patriarch Peter II of Alexandria (Greek: Πέτρος Β΄ Αλεξανδρείας; died 27 February 381) was the 21st Patriarch of Alexandria from AD 373 to AD 381. He was a disciple of Athanasius of Alexandria who designated him as his successor before his death in 373.

The Arians opposed his appointment and shortly after his consecration, the prefect Palladius, acting on orders from Emperor Valens drove him from the city and installed Lucius, an adherent of Arianism as bishop. Pope Damasus I, hearing of this new persecution, sent a deacon with a letter of communion and consolation for Peter; the messenger was arrested, treated as a criminal, savagely beaten, and sent to the mines of Phenne.

Peter remained for some time in concealment, and then found refuge at Rome, where Damasus received him and gave him support against the Arians. While there, he participated in a council to condemn Apollinarism. Peter returned to Alexandria in the spring of 378, where Lucius yielded out of fear of the populace.

Peter was a staunch defender of Nicene theology, a position endorsed by Theodosius I, who cites Peter of Alexandria in his Edict of Thessalonica. The Emperor called Peter a man of apostolic holiness.

Peter died around 380 and was succeeded by his brother Timothy.

== Sources ==
- "Petros II (373–381)". Official web site of the Greek Orthodox Patriarchate of Alexandria and All Africa.
- Woods, Joseph. "The Church of Alexandria." The Catholic Encyclopedia. Vol. 1. New York: Robert Appleton Company, 1907

Titles of the Great Christian Church
Preceded by Athanasius I	Pope and Patriarch of Alexandria; 373–380	Succeeded by Timothy I
