= Luca Martini =

Italian engineer and academic

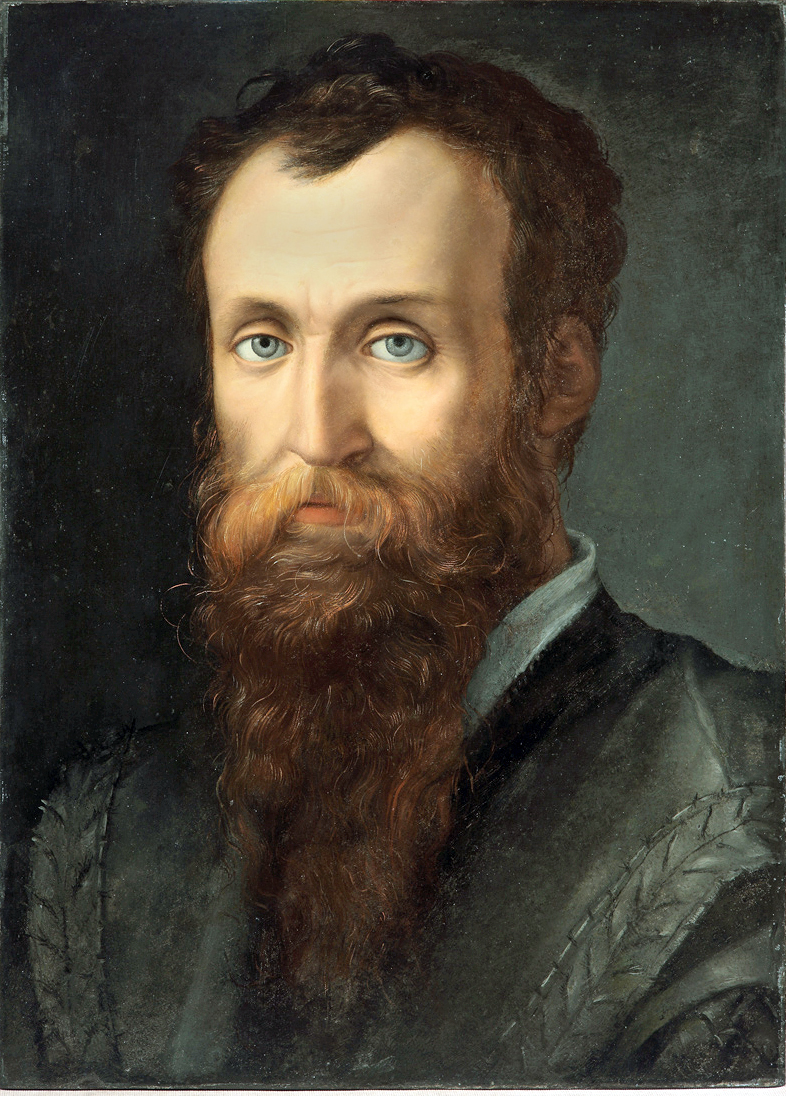
Luca Martini, by Bronzino

Luca Martini (February 8, 1507 – January 9, 1561) was an Italian engineer, academic, poet, and art patron known for commissioning projects from among other artists Pierino da Vinci and Giorgio Vasari.

== Biography ==
He was born in Florence to Angelo di Guglielmo and Elena di Filippo Bracciolini, granddaughter of the famous humanist Poggio Bracciolini.

Martini was made a member of literary academies at the court of Cosimo I de' Medici, Grand Duke of Tuscany in Florence and Pisa and was a consultant to the potentate. He was an engineer by profession for most of his career and a patron of the arts. He was commissioned to build the Loggia del Mercato Nuovo in Florence in 1546. In 1550 he was appointed Provider of the Office of the Galleys and the Office of the Rivers and Ditches of Pisa, carrying out engineering works for the drainage of the malaria-infested swamps around in Pisa. He distinguished himself in burlesque poetry and was a friend of numerous writers, including Annibal Caro. Martini is mentioned in The Life of Benvenuto Cellini.

Martini commissioned and suggested the story for The Death of Count Ugolino Della Gherendesca and his son by Pierino Da Vinci and in 1548 employed him to create the marble statue Young River God with Three Putti for the wife of Duke Cosimo Eleanor of Toledo. In 1555 Pierino da Vinci executed a profile portrait of a man in Carrara marble widely believed to be Martini. Pierino Da Vinci at one point came to live with Martini in Pisa and even traveled with his patron to Genoa. Martini wrote a sonnet revisiting the Genoan journey. Pierino Da Vinci died shortly after the pair's trip to Genoa and following his demise another young sculptor Stoldo Lorenzi moved into Martini's Pisan Palazzo and enjoyed his artistic patronage, meanwhile completing several projects Pierino had left unfinished including the marble relief Pisa Restored.

Bronzino executed several portraits of Martini including one of him holding a map of the Pisan countryside which it has been suggested "may well be the earliest example of an accurate, measured map included within a work of art". . Moreover, Martini commissioned the 1544 oil on panel work Six Tuscan Poets by Giorgio Vasari depicting Cino da Pistoia, Guittone d'Arezzo, Petrarch, Giovanni Boccaccio, Dante Alighieri, and Guido Cavalcanti. Giorgio Vasari included representations of Martini in two frescoed tondi decorating the Palazzo Vecchio in Florence. In Cosimo I Visits the Fortifications of Elba Luca is depicted as the man at the far left with a long beard holding a scroll inscribed ‘Luca Martini Provveditore di Pisa’. He is also portrayed in the backdrop of Cosimo I with His Architects, Engineers and Sculptors.

== Death ==
Martini died in Pisa on January 9, 1561, from malaria.

== Bibliography ==
- Apparati della Vita by Benvenuto Cellini, edition edited by Ettore Camesasca, Classici Bur, Milan 2007, first edition 1985. ISBN 978-88-17-16532-7
- Franco Angiolini, MARTINI, Luca, in the Biographical Dictionary of Italians, vol. 71, Rome, Institute of the Italian Encyclopedia, 2008. Retrieved November 4, 2018
