= Pierino da Vinci =

Italian sculptor

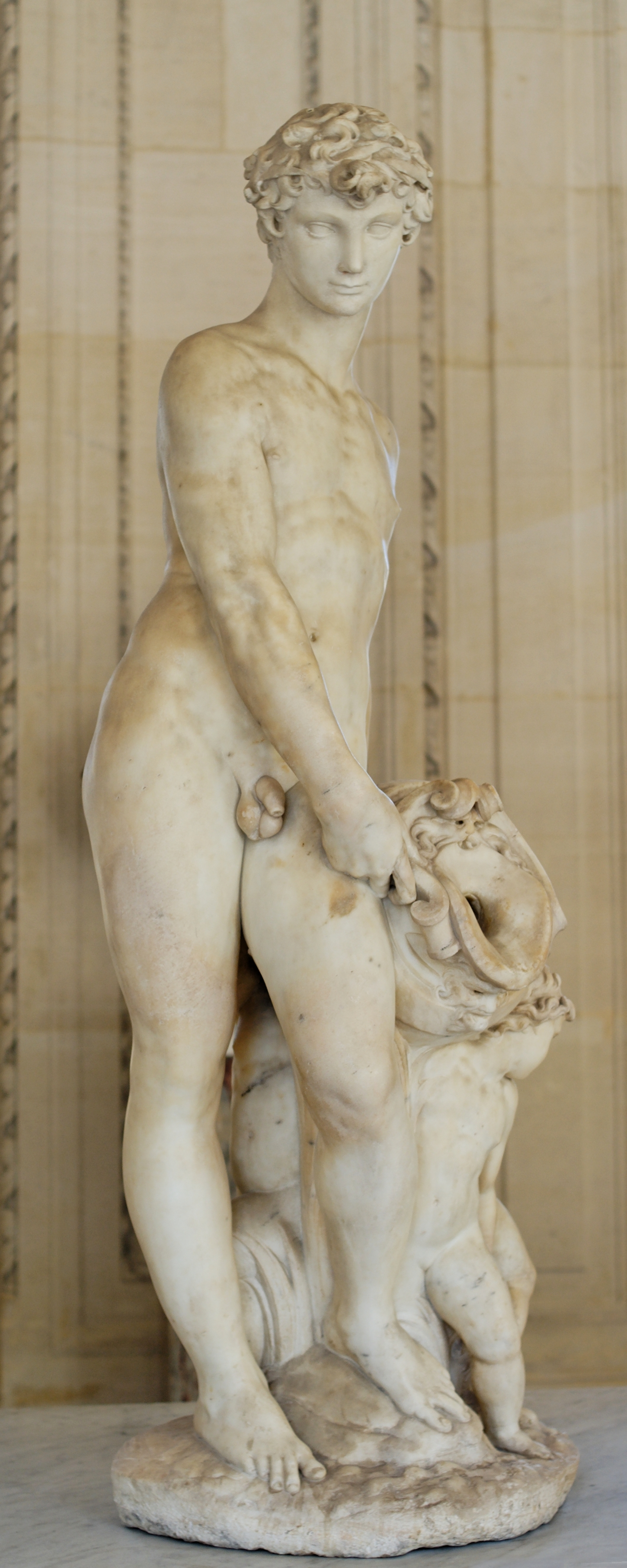
Young River God with Three Putti, marble sculpture by Pierino da Vinci, the Louvre

Pierino da Vinci (Italian: [pjeˈriːno da (v)ˈvintʃi]; c. 1529–1553/54), born Pier Francesco di Bartolomeo di Ser Piero da Vinci, was an Italian sculptor, born in the small town of Vinci in Tuscany; he was the nephew of Leonardo da Vinci.

The son of Bartolomeo da Vinci, Leonardo’s younger half-brother, Pierino demonstrated artistic ability at an early age; and was seen by his family as the heir to his uncle's talent. He studied under both Baccio Bandinelli (1488–1560) and Niccolò Tribolo (1500–1550). Pierino died from malarial fever at the age of 23, in Pisa, in 1553-4.

The biographical information about this artist comes almost exclusively from Lives of the Most Excellent Painters, Sculptors, and Architects by Giorgio Vasari; this history of art and artists reports a mixture of fact and legend, making it difficult to establish reliable historical information about the subject, in the absence of other sources. A relief that was admired by Vasari and was long thought to be by Michelangelo was recently the subject of an unsuccessful effort to keep it in the United Kingdom when it came up for auction. According to Vasari, the relief was made by Pierino in 1549 for Luca Martini dell’Ala (1507–1561), who was then in Pisa in the service of Cosimo I de' Medici, Grand Duke of Tuscany. It depicts Ugolino and his sons. The work is now in the collection of the Liechtenstein Museum.

Several sculptures, now believed to be by Pierino da Vinci, were at one time attributed to Michelangelo.

His Samson Slaying a Philistine (1551/52) is displayed at the Palazzo Vecchio in Florence.

Portrait of a Young Man (ca. 1550) by Bronzino is thought to be of him.

== Bibliography ==
- Britta Kusch-Arnhold, Pierino da Vinci, Beiträge zur Kunstgeschichte des Mittelalters und der Renaissance, vol. 14, Münster, Rhema-Verlag, 2008 (ISBN 978-3-930454-74-7).
- Cianchi, Marco, Pierino da Vinci: atti della giornata di studio, Vinci, Biblioteca leonardiana, Firenze, Becocci, 1995.
- Goguel, Catherine Monbeigl, Maestri toscani del Cinquecento: Michelangelo, Sansovino, Bandinelli, Jacone, Montorsoli, Salviati, Vasari, Dosio, Pierino da Vinci, Giambologna, etc., Firenze, Istituto Alinari, 1979.
- Middeldorf, Ulrich, Additions to the Work of Pierino da Vinci, The Burlington Magazine for Connoisseurs, Vol. 53, No. 309 (Dec., 1928), 298-306.
- Rosi, Mino, Pierino da Vinci, Profilo Interpretativo, Pisa, ETS, 2000.
- Vasari, Giorgio, Le Vite delle più eccellenti pittori, scultori, ed architettori, many editions and translations.
