= Pseudo-Macarius =

Anonymous author or authors of works falsely attributed to Macarius of Egypt

Pseudo-Macarius (or Pseudo-Makarios) is the conventional designation of the anonymous author or authors of works falsely attributed to Macarius of Egypt.

Fifty Spiritual Homilies were ascribed to Macarius a few generations after his death, and these texts had a widespread and considerable influence on Eastern monasticism and Protestant pietism. This was particularly in the context of the debate concerning the 'extraordinary giftings' of the Holy Spirit in the post-apostolic age, since the Macarian Homilies could serve as evidence in favour of a post-apostolic attestation of 'miraculous' Pneumatic giftings to include healings, visions, exorcisms, etc. The Macarian Homilies have thus influenced Pietist groups ranging from the Spiritual Franciscans (West) to Eastern Orthodox monastic practice to John Wesley to modern charismatic Christianity.

However, modern patristic scholars have established that it is not likely that Macarius the Egyptian was their author. The identity of the author of these fifty Spiritual Homilies has not been definitively established, although it is evident from statements in them that the author was from Upper Mesopotamia, where the Roman Empire bordered the Persian Empire, and that they were not written later than 534.

In addition to the homilies, a number of letters have been ascribed to Macarius. Gennadius (De viris illustribus 10) recognizes only one genuine letter of Macarius, which is addressed to younger monks. The first letter, called "Ad filios Dei," may indeed be the genuine letter by Macarius the Egyptian that is mentioned by Gennadius (Vir. Ill.10), but the other letters are probably not by Macarius. The second letter, the so-called "Great Letter" used the De instituto christiana of Gregory of Nyssa, which was written c. 390; the style and content of the "Great Letter" suggest that its author is the same anonymous Mesopotamian who wrote the fifty Spiritual Homilies.

The seven so-called Opuscula ascetica edited under his name by Petrus Possinus (Paris, 1683) are merely later compilations from the homilies, made by Simeon the Logothete, who is probably identical with Simeon Metaphrastes (d. 950). The teachings of Macarius are characterized by a strong Pneumatic emphasis that closely intertwines the salvific work of Jesus Christ (as the 'Spirit of Christ') with the supernatural workings of the Holy Spirit. This 'Pneumatic' thrust in the Spiritual Homilies is often termed 'mystical' and as such is a spiritual mode of thought which has endeared him to Christian mystics of all ages, although, on the other hand, in his anthropology and soteriology he frequently approximates the standpoint of St. Augustine. Certain passages of his homilies assert the entire depravity of man, while others postulate free will, even after the fall of Adam, and presuppose a tendency toward virtue, or, in semi-Pelagian fashion, ascribe to man the power to attain a degree of readiness to receive salvation.
