= Lucius of Alexandria =

Patriarch of Alexandria in 363 and from 373 to 380

Lucius of Alexandria (Greek: Λούκιος της Αλεξάνδρειας) was an Arian who was twice installed as Patriarch of Alexandria, first in 363, during the reign of Athanasius, and the second between 373 and 380, competing with Peter II of Alexandria.

Preceded by Athanasius I Peter II of Alexandria	Pope of Alexandria (disputed); 363–363; 373–380	Succeeded by Athanasius I Peter II of Alexandria
