= Bibliomancy =

Use of books in divination

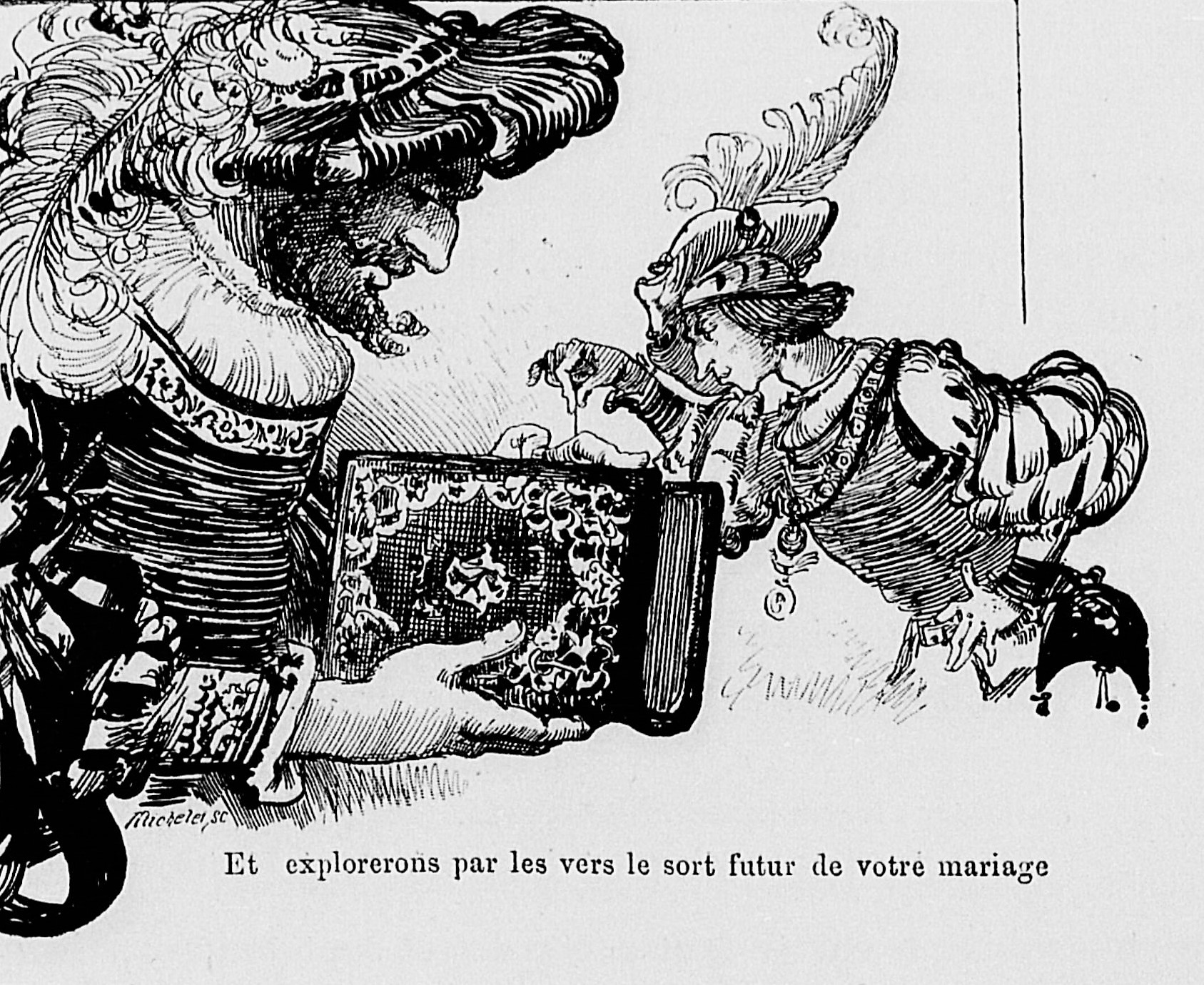
Panurge and Pantagruel use a book of Virgil's poems for bibliomancy, in The Third Book of Pantagruel

Bibliomancy is the use of books in divination. The use of sacred books (especially specific words and verses) for "magical medicine", for removing negative entities, or for divination is widespread in many religions of the world.

== Terminology ==
According to the Oxford English Dictionary, the word bibliomancy (etymologically from βιβλίον biblion- 'book' and μαντεία -manteía 'divination by means of') "divination by books, or by verses of the Bible" was first recorded in 1753 (Chambers' Cyclopædia). Sometimes this term is used synonymously with stichomancy (from στίχος stichos- 'row, line, verse') "divination by lines of verse in books taken at hazard", which was first recorded c. 1693 (Urquhart's Rabelais).

Bibliomancy compares with rhapsodomancy (from rhapsode 'poem, song, ode') "divination by reading a random passage from a poem". A historical precedent was the ancient Roman practice of sortes ('sortilege, divination by drawing lots') which specialized into sortes Homericae, sortes Virgilianae, and sortes Sanctorum, using the texts of Homer, Virgil, and the Bible.

== Method ==
The diviner selects a book that is believed to hold truth. They open it at a random page, and place their finger in a random place on that page. They then read the one or two sentences that they find themselves pointing to.

Among Christians, the Bible is most commonly used (sortes biblicae; the Sortes Sanctorum was used in antiquity as an aid), and in Islamic cultures the Quran. In the Middle Ages the use of Virgil's Aeneid was common in Europe and known as the sortes Virgilianae. In the classical world the sortes Virgilianae and sortes Homericae (using the Iliad and Odyssey) were used.

In Iran, bibliomancy using The Divān of Hafez is the most popular for this kind of divination, but by no means the only kind. The Quran, as well as the Mathnawī of Rumi may also be used. Fāl-e Ḥafez may be used for one or more persons.

There is a prevalent practice among certain, particularly messianic, members of Chabad-Lubavitch Chasidic movement to use the Igrot Kodesh, a thirty-volume collection of letters written by their leader Menachem Mendel Schneerson for guidance.

Another variant requires the selection of a random book from a library before selecting the random passage from that book. This also holds if a book has fallen down from a shelf on its own. English poet Robert Browning used this method to ask about the fate of his attraction to Elizabeth Barrett (later known as Elizabeth Barrett Browning). He was at first disappointed to choose the book Cerutti's Italian Grammar, but on randomly opening it his eyes fell on the following sentence: "if we love in the other world as we do in this, I shall love thee to eternity" (which was a translation exercise).

== In Islam ==
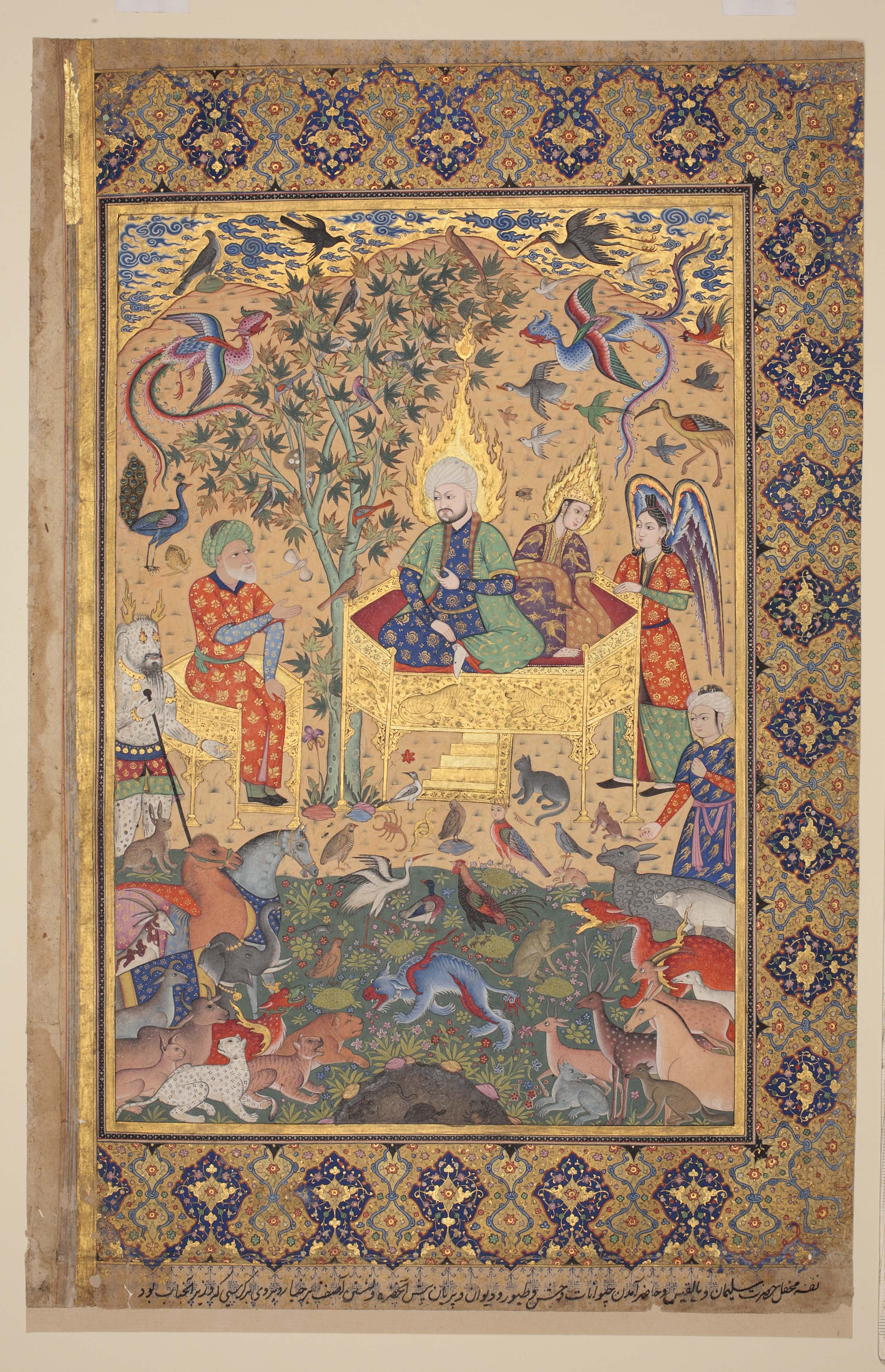
Animals gathering before King Solomon and Queen Bilqis from the Khalili Falnama (17th century Golconda). Opening the book to this painting was interpreted as a favourable prediction.

Bibliomancy has a long history in Islamic culture, using both secular and religious books, especially the Quran. The Persian word Falnama or Falnamah ("Book of omens" or "Book of divinations") covers two forms of bibliomancy used historically in Iran, Turkey, and India. Quranic Falnamas were sections at the end of Quran manuscripts used for fortune-telling based on a grid. It was common for Quran manuscripts produced in India and Iran to have folios at the end specifically for divination, from at least the late 14th century to the 19th. In the 16th century, Falnama manuscripts were introduced that used a different system; individuals performed purification rituals, opened a random page in the book and interpreted their fortune in light of the painting and its accompanying text. Only a few illustrated Falnamas now survive; these were commissioned by rich patrons and are unusually large books for the time, with bold, finely executed paintings.

Falnama manuscripts were unusually large books; the surviving examples range from 40 centimetres (16 in) to more than 66 centimetres (26 in) high. The paintings combined secular and religious imagery and their depiction of religious and mythical figures was very influential on other works. Each painting told the story of an event, although there was no narrative for the book as a whole; the order of paintings was random. They were consulted to divine the prospects for a major decision (such as a business venture, marriage, or house move) or to divine the condition of absent relatives or friends. To answer a question, readers would perform ablutions, recite prayers from the Quran and then open the book at a random page. The text explained whether the prediction was favourable, unfavourable, or middling. For example, a painting of the Sun would suggest a favourable outcome while a villain usually meant a disastrous outcome. To avoid the worst outcomes, the text recommended pious acts such as prayer, pilgrimage, or kindness to others.

== In fiction ==
- In Michael Strogoff (1876) by Jules Verne, Feofar Khan judged Michael Strogoff to blindness after pointing randomly in the Koran at the phrase: "And he will no more see the things of this earth."
- In The Book of Webster's (1993) by J. N. Williamson, the sociopathic protagonist Dell uses the dictionary to guide his actions.
- In the short story "The Ash-tree" by M. R. James, bibliomancy is used to produce a warning message from the Bible.
- The novel The First Verse by Barry McCrea tells the story of Niall Lenihan, a student who falls in with a 'cult' whose members use sortes to guide them.
- In Wilkie Collins' 1868 novel The Moonstone, the narrator Gabriel Betteredge routinely practices bibliomancy using the pages of Daniel Defoe's Robinson Crusoe. This is a good example of intertextuality, since Crusoe himself uses bibliomancy in his journey toward redemption.
- In Lirael, by Garth Nix, The Black Book of Bibliomancy, a fake book, is mentioned.
- In Augusten Burroughs' Running with Scissors, bibliomancy (referred to as "Bible-dipping") is used by one of the main characters.
- The narrator of Graham Greene's Travels With My Aunt recounts that his late father used to practice bibliomancy with the writings of Walter Scott: "Once, when he was suffering severely from Constipation, he opened Rob Roy at random and read out "Mr Owen entered. So regular were the motions and habits of this worthy man". (Travels With My Aunt, Ch.16.)

== See also ==
- Bible code
