= Rhapsodomancy =

Divination using a passage or poem

Rhapsodomancy is an ancient form of divination performed by choosing through some method a specific passage or poem from which to ascertain information.

There were various methods for practicing rhapsodomancy. Sometimes, individuals would write several verses or sentences from a poet on multiple pieces of wood, paper, or similar material, shake them together in an urn, and pick one at random. Sometimes, they cast dice on a table that was covered with verses; the one on which the die landed was said to contain the prediction.

In ancient Rome, the method of sortes involved opening a book and choosing some verse at first sight. This method was particularly called the sortes Praenestinae; and afterwards, according to the poet who was used, such as sortes Homerica or sortes Virgilianae.

== Commonly used texts ==
=== I Ching ===
One of the most commonly used texts used to perform rhapsodomancy was the I Ching. In the 11th century, before the text was used primarily as a philosophical treatise, random chance was used to determine which texts would be selected. In the earliest of versions, turtle shells were 'read' to select texts. In later practices of this divination, coins were tossed to select passages and texts, but this soon evolved into a more convoluted practice using milfoil stalks.

Su Hsun, in his contemporary account, stated that:

[H]e took the milfoil. But in order to get an odd or even bunch in milfoil stalks, the person himself has to divide the entire bunch of stalks in two...Then we count the stalks by fours and comprehend that we count by fours; the remainder we take between our fingers and know that what is left is either one or two or three or four, and that we selected them. This is from man. But dividing all the stalks in two parts, we do not know [earlier] how many stalks are in each of them. This is from Heaven.

It has been suggested that the evolution and convolution of the method of divination was a result of scryers attempting to add legitimacy to their work.

Uniquely amongst texts regarding methods of divination, in the Shu Ching (Book of History or Book of Documents), it is suggested that the person seeking guidance reflect on what has been suggested, rather than take it at face value. It is thought that this flexibility of interpretation, as well as the suggestion that there is a moral obligation to deliberate on the findings of the scryer, that led to rhapsodomancy falling out of favour with the I Ching.

=== Sibylline Books ===
The sibylline books, thought to have written around the 6th century BC, were used by Greek Oracles throughout the time. After these texts were burned, along with the Temple of Jupiter, in 83 BC, another collection was compiled, though that too was burned in 405 AD.

The texts were used for divination in a primitive form of bibliomancy, which came much later. Though loosely described as books, the second compilation was likely written on loose leaves, or thin wood, which could then be shuffled, with texts drawn at random. It is known that the texts were mostly composed of Greek hexameter, but Cicero claimed some of the verses were in hieroglyphs or acrostic code.

The divinations were well known as vague and obscure proclamations. Virgil incorporated his wariness of the prophecies into The Aeneid, where Helenus warns Aeneas of the unreliability of their words.

== Transition to bibliomancy ==
Bibliomancy, another text-based form of divination, was first officially recorded in 1693 AD, and was mainly concerned with the Bible, rather than any variety of poetic texts. However, in their official recounting of the murder of Archbishop Sharp, the church attributes one participant's motivation to rhapsodomancy.

In the biography of evangelist George Whitefield, a note is made of the fact that a message was sent to him by contemporary John Wesley, regarding his voyages across the Atlantic. When communicating with Whitefield, Wesley presented him with a passage pulled, after prayer, out of lots, which read; 'Let Him Return to London'.

== See also ==
- Bibliomancy

== Bibliography ==
- Bennett, Deborah J. (1998). Randomness. Cambridge, Massachusetts: Harvard University Press. pp. 41–44. ISBN 0-674-10745-4.
- Shchutskii, Iulian K (1979). Researches on the I Ching Bollingen Series Lxii2. Princeton University Press. pp. 57, 232–233. ASIN B00GEEJY9E.
- Cicero, Marcus Tullius (1730). De Divinatione. 2 (in Latin). p. 110.
- Halliday, W. R. (1913). Greek Divination: A Study of Its Methods and Principles. MacMillan and Co. pp. 217–218.

== Notes ==
This article incorporates text from Cyclopædia, which is in the public domain.
