= Sortes biblicae =

Method of divination

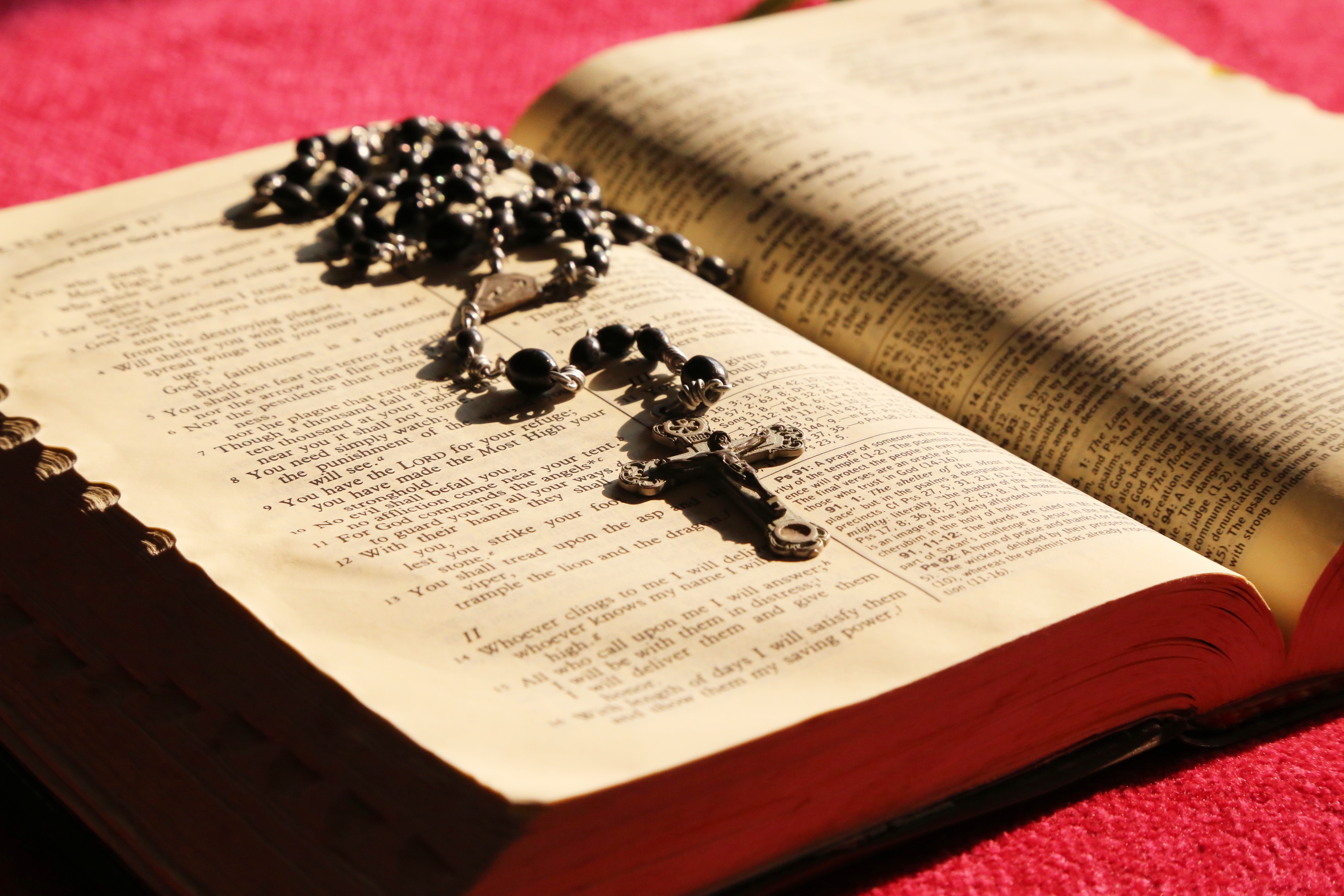
A copy of the Bible opened to an arbitrary page

Sortes biblicae (transl. biblical lots) is a method of divination where by the Bible is opened randomly and the first words which one sees or points to are interpreted as predictive. The practice was common in late antiquity and had pagan precedents in the Sortes Homericae and Sortes Vergilianae. It was nevertheless condemned by numerous church councils, including in Gaul alone by those of Vannes (465), Agde (506) and Orléans (511).

Sometimes Bibles were specially prepared for fortune-telling with fortunes being written in the lower margins. These were marked by the Ancient Greek word hermeneia ('interpretation'). The Bible could be opened at random or dice could be rolled to determine a page number. The 5th‐century Codex Bezae contains 69 such 'interpretations' added to the Gospel of Mark in the 9th or 10th century. The fortunes include "Expect a great miracle", "Seek something else" and "After ten days it will happen".

The sortes biblicae, widely practiced in the early Middle Ages, declined after the year 1000. In modern times, John Wesley is known to have treated the sortes biblicae seriously.
