= Rumspringa =

Rite of passage in some Amish and Mennonite Anabaptist communities

- Native name: Rumshpringa
- Time: Youths: Starting at 16 years old, in some groups at 17 (Wenger Mennonites)
- Type: Coming-of-age ceremony
- Theme: Entering into a more formalized social world during adolescence; finding a marriage partner.

Rumspringa (Pennsylvania German pronunciation: [ˈrʊmˌʃprɪŋə]), also spelled Rumschpringe or Rumshpringa (lit. 'running around', from Pennsylvania German rumschpringe 'to run around; to gad; to be wild'; compare Standard German herum-, rumspringen 'to jump around'), is a rite of passage during adolescence, used in some Amish communities. The Amish, a subsect of the Anabaptist Christian movement, intentionally segregate themselves from other communities as a part of their faith. For Amish youth, the Rumspringa normally begins at age 16 and ends when a youth chooses either to be baptized in the Amish church or to leave the community. For Wenger Mennonites, Rumspringa occurs mostly between ages of 17 and 21.

Not all Amish use this term (it does not occur in John A. Hostetler's extended discussion of adolescence among the Amish), but in sects that do, Amish elders generally view it as a time for courtship and finding a spouse. A popular view exists by which the period is institutionalized as a rite of passage, and the usual behavioral restrictions are relaxed, so that Amish youth can acquire some experience and knowledge of the non-Amish world.

== Etymology ==
Rumspringa is a Pennsylvania German noun meaning 'running around'. It is a cognate of the colloquial German verb rumspringen. As a cognate, this expression is closely related to the Standard German verb herumspringen meaning 'to jump around or about'. The Standard German term is a compound word of the adverb herum (around, about) and the verb springen ('to jump'). However, in some southern German dialects, springen (schbrenga in Swabian) means 'to run'. This term/concept also is used as a separable verb, i.e., rumspringen ('to jump around') / er springt rum ('he jumps around').

In Pennsylvania German, the prefix rum is a contraction of herum – a development which is also all but general to spoken standard German. The infinitive (and gerund) form -a is standard in Pennsylvania German and other forms of general Upper German.

== Popularized view ==
Amish adolescents may engage in rebellious behavior, resisting or defying parental norms. In many cultures, enforcement may be relaxed, and misbehavior tolerated or overlooked to a degree. A view of rumspringa has emerged in popular culture that this divergence from custom is an accepted part of adolescence or a rite of passage for Amish youth.

Among the Amish, however, rumspringa simply refers to adolescence. During that time a certain amount of misbehavior is unsurprising and is not severely condemned (for instance, by Meidung or shunning). Adults who have made a permanent and public commitment to the faith would be held to the higher standards of behavior defined in part by the Schleitheim and Dordrecht confessions. In a narrow sense, the young are not bound by the Ordnung because they have not taken adult membership in the church. Amish adolescents do remain, however, under the strict authority of parents who are bound to Ordnung, and there is no period when adolescents are formally released from these rules.

It is the period when a young person is considered to have reached maturity and is allowed to attend the Sunday night "singings," which are central to courtship among the Amish. According to Amish sources, a youth who attends one of these events before the age of 16 might be force-fed warm milk from a spoon, as a good-natured reminder to respect the social boundaries. Members of the local church district often attend the singings and usually bring younger children along.

A minority of Amish youth do diverge from established customs. Some may be found:

- Wearing non-traditional clothing and hair styles (referred to as "dressing English")
- Driving vehicles other than horse-drawn vehicles (for communities that eschew motor vehicles)
- Not attending home prayer
- Drinking and using other recreational drugs

Not all youth diverge from custom during this period; approximately half in the larger communities and the majority in smaller Amish communities remain within the norms of Amish dress or behavior during adolescence. Almost 90% of Amish teenagers choose to be baptized and join the Amish church.

== Leaving the community ==
Some Amish youth do indeed separate themselves from the community, even going to live among the "English," or non-Amish Americans, experiencing modern technology. Their behavior during this time does not necessarily prevent them from returning for adult baptism into the Amish church.

Most of them do not wander far from their family's homes during this time, and large numbers (85–90%) ultimately choose to join the church. However, this proportion varies from community to community, and within a community between more and less acculturated Amish. For example, Swartzentruber Amish have a lower retention rate than Andy Weaver Amish (90% vs 97%; although most of Swartzentruber Amish do not allow teenagers to leave the community during rumspringa at will). This figure was significantly lower as recently as the 1950s. Leaving the Amish community is not a long-term trend, and was more of a problem during the early colonial years.

== Variations ==
As among the non-Amish, there is variation among communities and individual families as to the best response to adolescent misbehavior. Some Amish communities hold views similar to Old Order Mennonite, and Conservative Mennonites in seeking more productive, spiritual activities for their youth. Some even take up meditation.

In some cases, patience and forbearance prevail, and in others, vigorous discipline. Far from an open separation from parental ways, the misbehavior of young people during the rumspringa is usually furtive, though often collective (this is especially true in smaller and more isolated populations). They may or may not mingle with non-Amish in these excursions. The age is marked normatively in some Amish communities by allowing the young man to purchase a small "courting buggy", or – in some communities – by painting the yard-gate blue (traditionally meaning "daughter of marriageable age living here"; the custom is noted by A. M. Aurand in The Amish (1938), along with the reasonable caution that sometimes a blue gate is just a blue gate). There is some opinion that adolescent rebellion tends to be more radical, more institutionalized (and therefore in a sense more accepted) in the more restrictive communities.

The nature of the rumspringa period differs from individual to individual and from community to community. In large Amish communities like those of Lancaster County, Pennsylvania; Holmes and Wayne Counties, Ohio; and Elkhart and LaGrange Counties, Indiana, the Amish are numerous enough that an Amish youth subculture exists. During rumspringa, the Amish youth in these large communities will join one of various groups ranging from the most rebellious to the least. These groups are not necessarily divided across traditional Amish church district boundaries, although they often are. In many smaller communities, Amish youth may have a much more restricted rumspringa, and likewise may be less likely to partake in strong rebellious behavior, as they lack the anonymity of larger communities.

Wenger Mennonites youth go through a period of rumspringa starting at age 17 and typically ending at marriage, a few years older than the Amish do. Since most of the youth get baptized when they are ages 16 to 19, they typically do not get into the type of serious offenses of the most "disorderly" of the Amish youth.
