= Council of Rome (382) =

382 Christian synod

The Council of Rome of 382 is a Christian synod convened in Rome in the year 382 AD, under the leadership of Pope Damasus I, being, at the time, the bishop of Rome. It is widely held that this council initially set a Biblical canon in a decree (that is, the Decretum Gelasianum, or "Gelasian Decree") which is identical to the list of the Council of Trent, though the historicity of this notion has been brought into question.

== Occasion ==
The previous year, the Emperor Theodosius I had appointed the candidate Nectarius as Archbishop of Constantinople. The bishops of the West opposed the election result and asked for a common synod of East and West to settle the succession of the see of Constantinople, and so the Emperor Theodosius, soon after the close of the First Council of Constantinople in 381, summoned the Imperial bishops to a fresh synod at Constantinople; nearly all of the same bishops who had attended the earlier synod re-assembled in the early summer of 382. On arrival they received a letter from the synod of Milan, inviting them to a great general council at Rome; they indicated that they must remain where they were, because they had not made any preparations for such long a journey; however, they sent three—Syriacus, Eusebius, and Priscian—with a joint synodal letter to Pope Damasus, Ambrose, archbishop of Milan, and the other bishops assembled in the council at Rome.

== Decree ==
Jerome mentions the synod twice, but only in passing.

The Oxford Dictionary of the Christian Church states:

A council probably held at Rome in 382 under St. Damasus gave a complete list of the canonical books of both the Old Testament and the New Testament (also known as the 'Gelasian Decree' because it was reproduced by Gelasius in 495), which is identical with the list given at Trent.

The Oxford Dictionary of the Christian Church also notes that "according to E. von Dobschütz, the Gelasian Decree is not a Papal work at all, but a private compilation which was composed in Italy (but not at Rome) in the early 6th century. Other scholars, while accepting this date, think it originated in Gaul".

Catholic apologist and historian William Jurgens writes:

The first part of this decree has long been known as the Decree of Damasus, and concerns the Holy Spirit and the seven-fold gifts. The second part of the decree is more familiarly known as the opening part of the Gelasian Decree, in regard to the canon of Scripture: De libris recipiendis vel non recipiendis. It is now commonly held that the part of the Gelasian Decree dealing with the accepted canon of Scripture is an authentic work of the Council of Rome of 382 A.D. and that Gelasius edited it again at the end of the fifth century, adding to it the catalog of the rejected books, the apocrypha. It is now almost universally accepted that these parts one and two of the Decree of Damasus are authentic parts of the Acts of the Council of Rome of 382 A.D.

On the other hand, several scholars consider that the list of books cannot be an authentic decree of the Council of Rome of 382. Hahnemann argues against the Decretum originating in Pope Damasus's time based on Jerome's silence about a canonical list issued by the council of Rome in 382: “It seems highly improbable that, if Jerome, who was probably present at the council and was certainly at Rome, had ever heard of such a pronouncement about canonical books, he should nowhere have mentioned it, or that it should not have qualified his own statements on the Canon. [...] Yet there is no mention or evidence of a change of position in the works of Jerome. The authenticity of at least the catalogue in the Damasine Decree is thus called into question.” The same view is shared by Edmon L. Gallagher and Clare K. Rothschild.
