= Saint Perpetuus =

French bishop (died 490)

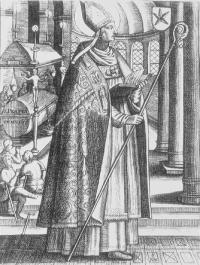

Bishop and Confessor
- Born: 4th century AD; Aquitaine
- Died: 30 December 490 AD; Tours
- Venerated in: Roman Catholic Church
- Feast: 8 April
- Attributes: Depicted as a bishop directing the building of a church. Sometimes the sick may be shown being healed at his tomb or as his relics are carried in procession.

Perpetuus (French: Saint-Perpetue) (born 4th century AD - died 30 December 490 AD) (Note: His death is also given as 8 April 491.) was the sixth Bishop of Tours, serving from 460 to 490.

== Life ==
Born of a senatorial family of the Auvergne, Perpetuus became bishop of Tours around 460. He succeeded his relative, possibly an uncle, Eustochius, and was succeeded by another close relative, Volusian. He was a student of sacred literature and a friend of the poet Sidonius Apollinaris.

It is said of him that he dedicated his considerable wealth to the relief of those in need. He guided the Church of Tours for thirty years, developing and consolidating Christianity in Touraine.

In 461, Perpetuus presided at a council in which eight bishops who were reunited in Tours on the Feast of St. Martin had participated, and at this assembly an important rule was promulgated relative to ecclesiastical discipline. He maintained a careful surveillance over the conduct of the clergy of his diocese, and mention is made of priests who were removed from their office because they had proved unworthy. In 465, he presided over the Council of Vannes, which condemned the use of the Sortes Sanctorum.

Perpetuus actively promoted the cult of Saint Martin of Tours. He replaced with a beautiful basilica (470) the little chapel of SS. Peter and Paul that Britius had constructed, to protect the tomb of Saint Martin. Euphronius of Autun sent marble for the cover of Martin's tomb. Perpetuus commissioned murals for the walls and inscriptions that explained them. Sidonius contributed a poem for the apse. Built 550 paces from the city, Martin's body was translated with great ceremony in July 473. Perpetuus effectively popularized the cult by making it more accessible, both to the educated classes "...and to ordinary people who could visit the church, view its murals, participate in the festivals, and listen to readings about the saint."

He built monasteries and a good many other churches, notably one in honour of Saint Peter and Saint Paul, which he constructed to receive the roof of the old chapel, as it was of elegant workmanship.

Gregory of Tours states that Perpetuus decreed that all of the members of his diocese should fast on Wednesdays and Fridays, except for a few church festivals. He set aside several Mondays as fasts as well, especially from the Feast of St. Martin until the Nativity, a precursor of Advent. These fasts were still being observed in the 7th century.

At his death, Perpetuus left his vineyards, gold, and houses to benefit the poor. He was buried in the Church of St. Martin, which he had built.

== See also ==
- Saint Perpetuus, patron saint archive
