= Pope Damasus I =

Head of the Catholic Church from 366 to 384

Pope Saint Damasus I
- Bishop of Rome
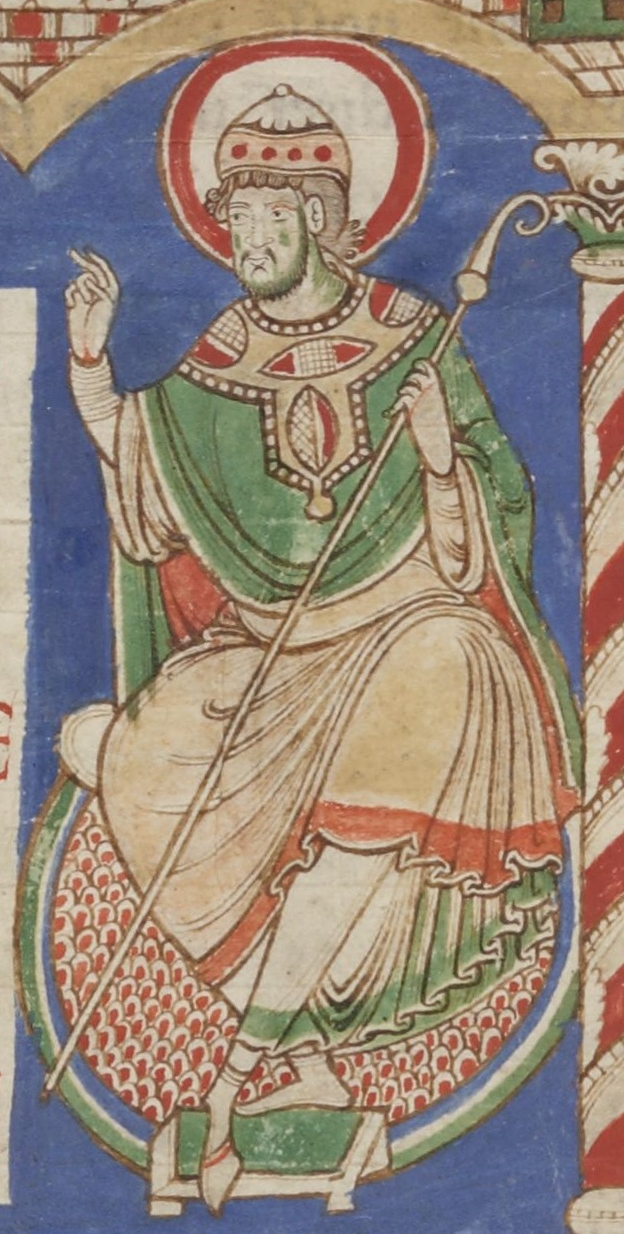
- Damasus I depicted in the 11th-century Second Bible of St Martial of Limoges
- Church: Catholic Church
- Papacy began: 1 October 366
- Papacy ended: 11 December 384
- Predecessor: Liberius
- Successor: Siricius

Personal details
- Born: c. 305 Rome or Hispania, Roman Empire
- Died: 11 December 384 Rome, Roman Empire

Sainthood
- Feast day: 11 December (Catholicism,Western Rite Orthodoxy)
- Venerated in: Catholic Church; Eastern Orthodox Church Oriental Orthodoxy
- Attributes: as a pope with patriarchal cross and model of a church
- Patronage: Archaeologists, against fever

Pope Damasus I (/ˈdæməsəs/; c. 305 – 11 December 384), also known as Damasus of Rome, was the bishop of Rome from October 366 to his death in 384. He presided over the Council of Rome of 382, which established the canon, or official list, of sacred scripture.

Damasus spoke out against major heresies (including Apollinarianism and Macedonianism), thus solidifying the faith of the Catholic Church, and encouraged production of the Vulgate Bible with his support for Jerome. He helped reconcile the relations between the Church of Rome and the Church of Antioch, and encouraged the veneration of martyrs.

As well as various prose letters and other pieces, Damasus was the author of Latin verse. Alan Cameron describes his epitaph for a young girl called Projecta (of great interest to scholars as the Projecta Casket in the British Museum may have been made for her). Damasus has been described as "the first society Pope", and was possibly a member of a group of Hispanic Christians, largely related to each other, who were close to the Hispanic Theodosius I.

Several images of "DAMAS" in gold glass cups probably depict him and appear to be the first surviving contemporary images of a pope, though there is no real attempt at a likeness. "Damas" appears with other figures, including a Florus who may be Projecta's father.

He is recognized as a saint by the Catholic Church; his feast day is 11 December.

== Background ==
His life coincided with the rise of Emperor Constantine I and the reunion and re-division of the Western and Eastern Roman Empires, which is associated with the legitimization of Christianity and its later adoption as the official religion of the Roman state in 380.

The reign of Gratian, which coincided with Damasus' papacy, forms an important epoch in ecclesiastical history, since during that period (359–383), Catholic Christianity for the first time became dominant throughout the empire. Under the influence of Ambrose, Gratian refused to wear the insignia of the pontifex maximus as unbefitting a Christian, removed the Altar of Victory from the Senate at Rome, despite protests from the pagan members of the Senate. Emperor Gratian also forbade legacies of real property to the Vestals and abolished other privileges belonging to them and to the pontiffs.

== Early life ==
Pope Damasus I was either born in Rome or in Hispania around 305, before moving to Rome at a young age with his parents. Damasus' parents were Antonius, who became a priest at the Church of St. Lawrence (San Lorenzo) in Rome, and his wife Laurentia. Both parents originally came from the region of Lusitania. Damasus began his ecclesiastical career as a deacon in his father's church, where he went on to serve as a priest. This later became the basilica of Saint Lawrence outside the Walls in Rome.

Damasus was archdeacon of the Roman church when Pope Liberius was banished by Emperor Constantius II to Berea in 354. Damasus followed Liberius into exile, though he immediately returned to Rome. During the period before Liberius' return, Damasus had a great share in the government of the church.

== Succession crisis ==
In the early Church, bishops were customarily elected by the clergy and the people of the diocese. While this simple method worked well in a small community of Christians unified by persecution, as the congregation grew in size, the acclamation of a new bishop was fraught with division, and rival claimants and a certain class hostility between patrician and plebeian candidates unsettled some episcopal elections. At the same time, 4th-century emperors expected each new pope-elect to be presented to them for approval, which sometimes led to state domination of the Church's internal affairs.

Following the death of Pope Liberius on 24 September 366, Damasus succeeded to the Papacy amidst factional violence. The deacons and laity supported Liberius' deacon Ursinus. The upper-class former partisans of Felix, who had ruled during Liberius' exile, supported the election of Damasus.

The two were elected simultaneously (Damasus' election was held in San Lorenzo in Lucina). J. N. D. Kelly states that Damasus hired a gang of thugs that stormed the Julian Basilica, carrying out a three-day massacre of the Ursinians. Thomas Shahan says details of this scandalous conflict are related in the highly prejudiced "Libellus precum ad Imperatores" (P.L., XIII, 83–107), a petition to the civil authority on the part of Faustinus and Marcellinus, two anti-Damasan presbyters. Such was the violence and bloodshed that the two prefects of the city were called in to restore order, and after a first setback, when they were driven to the suburbs and a massacre of 137 was perpetrated in the basilica of Sicininus (the modern Basilica di Santa Maria Maggiore), the prefects banished Ursinus to Gaul. There was further violence when he returned, which continued after Ursinus was exiled again.

Another ancient narrative of events, the "Gesta" (dated to 368 AD), provides more detail. It describes Ursinus as being the valid successor to Liberius, and Damasus as following a heretical interloper, Felix. This account also records that an armed force instigated by Damasus broke into the Basilica of Julius and a three-day slaughtering of those assembled there took place. After gaining control of the Lateran basilica, Damasus was then ordained as bishop in the cathedral of Rome. However, Damasus was accused of bribing the urban officials of Rome to have Ursinus and his chief supporters exiled, including some presbyters. As a result of this attempt, some of the (apparently quite numerous) supporters of Ursinus interrupted this process and rescued the presbyters, taking them to the Basilica of Liberius (identified as the "basilica of Sicinnius"), the apparent headquarters of the Ursinian sect. Damasus then responded by ordering an attack against the Liberian basilica, resulting in another massacre: "They broke down the doors and set fire underneath it, then rushed in...and killed a hundred and sixty of the people inside, both men and women." Damasus next sent a final assault against some Ursinian supporters who had fled to the cemetery of Saint Agnes, slaying many.

Church historians such as Jerome and Rufinus championed Damasus. At a synod in 378, Ursinus was condemned, and Damasus exonerated and declared the true pope. The former antipope continued to intrigue against Damasus for the next few years and unsuccessfully attempted to revive his claim on Damasus's death. Ursinus was among the Arian party in Milan, according to Ambrose.

== Papacy ==
Damasus faced accusations of murder and adultery in his early years as pope. The accuracy of these claims has come into question, with some suggesting that the accusations were motivated by the conflict with the supporters of Arianism.

Damasus I was active in defending the Catholic Church against the threat of schisms. In two Roman synods (368 and 369) he condemned Apollinarianism and Macedonianism, and sent legates to the First Council of Constantinople that was convoked in 381 to address these heresies.

=== Council of Rome of 382 and the Biblical canon ===
One of the important works of Pope Damasus was to preside in the Council of Rome of 382, which determined the canon or official list of Sacred Scripture. The Oxford Dictionary of the Christian Church states: A council probably held at Rome in 382 under Damasus gave a complete list of the canonical books of both the Old Testament and the New Testament (also known as the 'Gelasian Decree' because it was reproduced by Gelasius in 495), which is identical with the list later given at the Council of Trent. American Catholic priest and historian William Jurgens stated: "The first part of this decree has long been known as the Decree of Damasus, and concerns the Holy Spirit and the seven-fold gifts. The second part of the decree is more familiarly known as the opening part of the Gelasian Decree, regarding the canon of Scripture: De libris recipiendis vel non-recipiendis. It is now commonly held that the part of the Gelasian Decree dealing with the accepted canon of Scripture is an authentic work of the Council of Rome of 382 A.D. and that Gelasius edited it again at the end of the fifth century, adding to it the catalog of the rejected books, the apocrypha. It is now almost universally accepted that these parts one and two of the Decree of Damasus are authentic parts of the Acts of the Council of Rome of 382 A.D."

=== Jerome, the Vulgate and the Canon ===
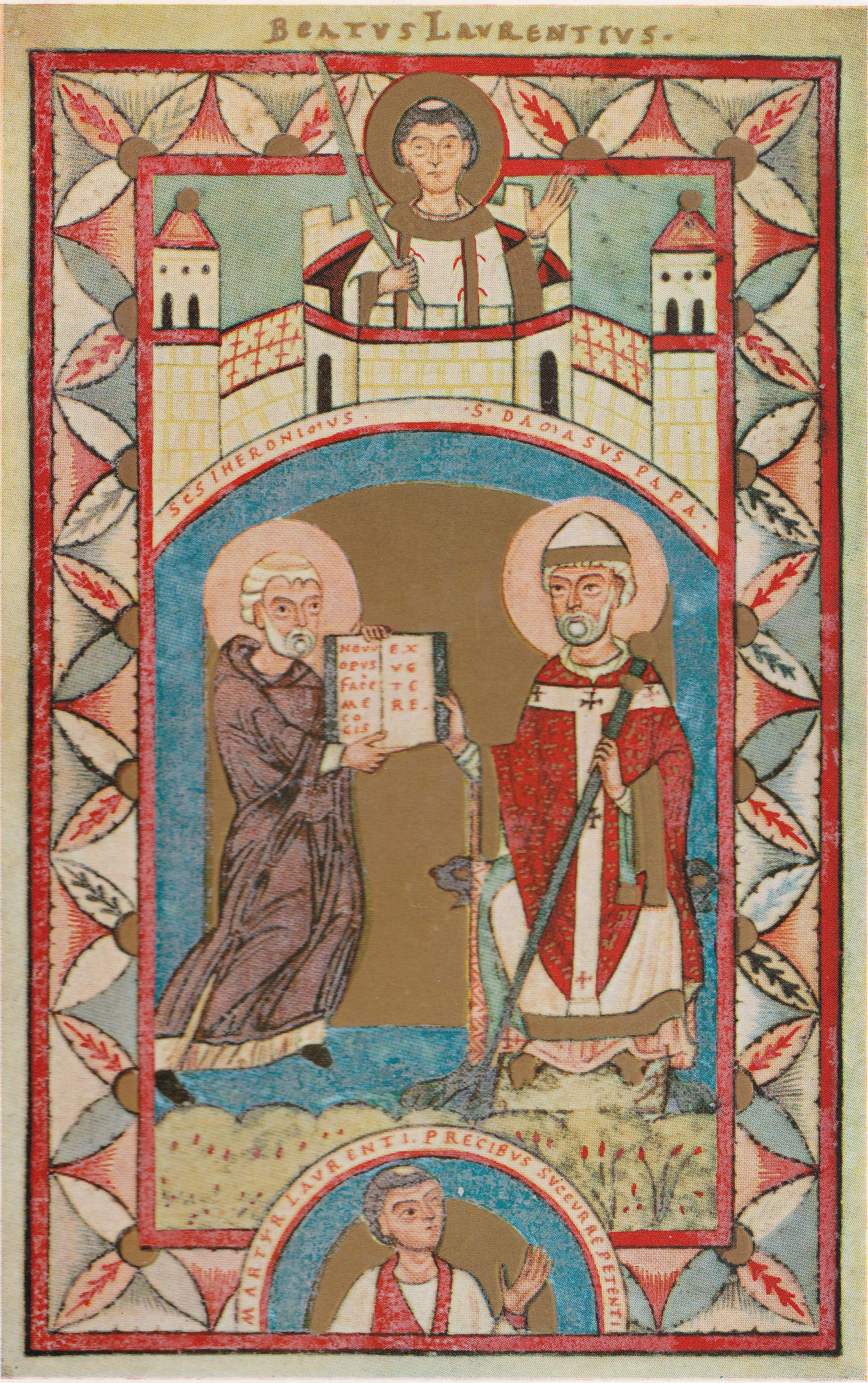
Jerome presents the Vulgate to Pope Damasus; miniature from the c. 1150 Gospel Book of Lund Cathedral (Cod. Ups. 83)

Pope Damasus appointed Jerome of Stridon as his confidential secretary. Invited to Rome originally to a synod of 382 convened to end the schism of Antioch, he made himself indispensable to the pope and took a prominent place in his councils. Jerome spent three years (382–385) in Rome in close intercourse with Pope Damasus and the leading Christians. Writing in 409, Jerome remarked: "A great many years ago when I was helping Damasus, bishop of Rome with his ecclesiastical correspondence, and writing his answers to the questions referred to him by the councils of the east and west..."

In order to put an end to the marked divergences in the western texts of that period, Damasus encouraged the highly respected scholar Jerome to revise the available Old Latin versions of the Bible into a more accurate Latin based on the Greek New Testament and the Septuagint, resulting in the Vulgate. According to Protestant biblical scholar, F.F. Bruce, the commissioning of the Vulgate was a key moment in fixing the biblical canon in the West. Nonetheless, as the Catholic Encyclopedia states:

In the Latin Church, all through the Middle Ages we find evidence of hesitation about the character of the deuterocanonicals. There is a current friendly to them, another one distinctly unfavourable to their authority and sacredness, while wavering between the two are a number of writers whose veneration for these books is tempered by some perplexity as to their exact standing, and among those we note St. Thomas Aquinas. Few are found to unequivocally acknowledge their canonicity. The prevailing attitude of Western medieval authors is substantially that of the Greek Fathers. The chief cause of this phenomenon in the West is to be sought in the influence, direct and indirect, of St. Jerome's depreciating Prologus.

Significant scholarly doubts and disagreements about the nature of the Apocrypha continued for centuries and even into the Council of Trent in the 16th century, which provided the first infallible definition of the Catholic canon in 1546.

Jerome devoted a very brief notice to Damasus in his De Viris Illustribus, written after Damasus' death: "he had a fine talent for making verses and published many brief works in heroic metre. He died in the reign of the emperor Theodosius at the age of almost eighty". Damasus may be the author of the anonymous Carmen contra paganos (song against the pagans).

==== Letter of Jerome to Damasus ====
The letters from Jerome to Damasus are examples of the primacy of the See of Peter:

Yet, though your greatness terrifies me, your kindness attracts me. From the priest I demand the safe-keeping of the victim, from the shepherd the protection due to the sheep. Away with all that is overweening; let the state of Roman majesty withdraw. My words are spoken to the successor of the fisherman, to the disciple of the cross. As I follow no leader save Christ, so I communicate with none but your blessedness, that is, with the chair of Peter. For this, I know, is the rock on which the church is built! This is the house where alone the paschal lamb can be rightly eaten. This is the ark of Noah, and he who is not found in it shall perish when the flood prevails. But since, by reason of my sins, I have betaken myself to this desert which lies between Syria and the uncivilized waste, I cannot, owing to the great distance between us, always ask of your sanctity the holy thing of the Lord. Consequently, I here follow the Egyptian confessors who share your faith, and anchor my frail craft under the shadow of their great argosies. I know nothing of Vitalis; I reject Meletius; I have nothing to do with Paulinus. He that gathers not with you scatters; he that is not of Christ is of Antichrist.

=== Relations with the Eastern Church ===
The Eastern Church, in the person of Basil of Caesarea, earnestly sought the aid and encouragement of Damasus against an apparently triumphant Arianism. Damasus, however, harbored some degree of suspicion against the great Cappadocian Doctor of the Church. In the matter of the Meletian Schism at Antioch, Damasus – together with Athanasius of Alexandria, and his successor, Peter II of Alexandria – sympathized with the party of Paulinus as more sincerely representative of Nicene orthodoxy. On the death of Meletius he sought to secure the succession for Paulinus and to exclude Flavian. During his papacy, Peter II of Alexandria sought refuge in Rome from the persecuting Arians. He was received by Damasus, who supported him against the Arians.

Damasus supported the appeal of the Christian senators to Emperor Gratian for the removal of the altar of Victory from the Senate House, and lived to welcome the famous edict of Theodosius I, "De fide Catholica" (27 February 380), which proclaimed as the religion of the Roman State that doctrine which Peter had preached to the Romans.

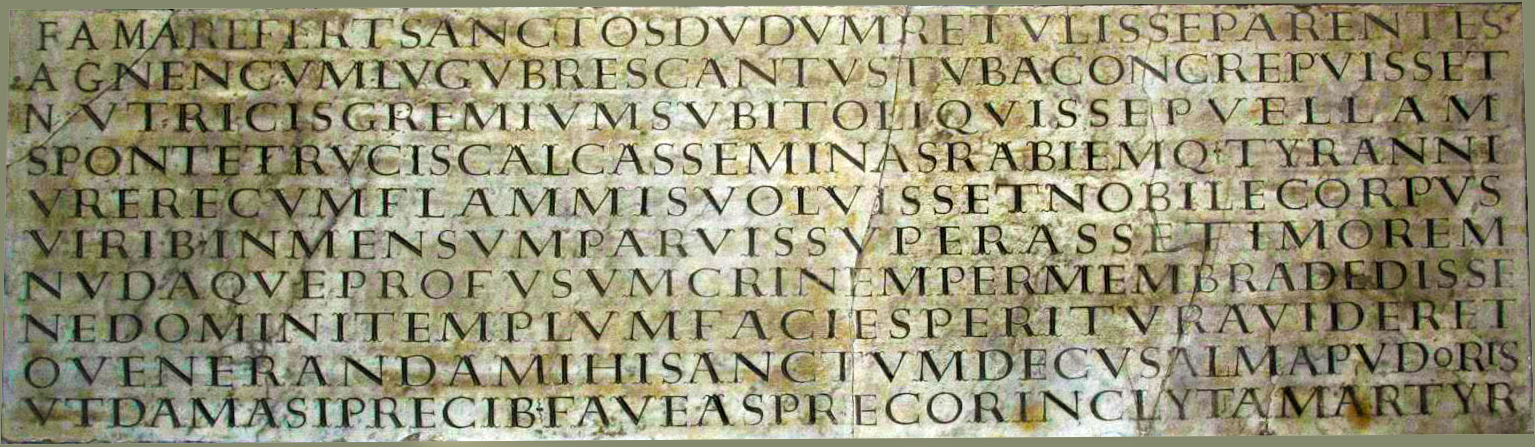
Facsimile of a Damasan inscription by the late 4th-century lapicide Philocalus in the Catacombs of Saint Agnes beneath the Constantinian basilica of Sant'Agnese fuori le Mura

=== Devotion to the martyrs ===
Damasus also did much to encourage the veneration of the Christian martyrs, restoring and creating access to their tombs in the Catacombs of Rome and elsewhere, and setting up tablets with verse inscriptions composed by himself, several of which survive or are recorded in his Epigrammata.

Damasus rebuilt or repaired his father's church, named for Laurence, known as San Lorenzo fuori le Mura ("St Lawrence outside the walls"), which by the 7th century was a station on the itineraries of the graves of the Roman martyrs. Damasus' regard for the Roman martyr is attested also by the tradition according to which the Pope built a church devoted to Laurence in his own house, San Lorenzo in Damaso.

Damasus was pope for eighteen years and two months. His feast day is 11 December. He was buried beside his mother and sister in a "funerary basilica ... somewhere between the Via Appia and Via Ardeatina", the exact location of which is lost.

== Literature ==
- Aste, Antonio, Gli epigrammi di papa Damaso I. Traduzione e commento. Libellula edizioni, collana Università (Tricase, Lecce 2014).
- Cameron, Alan, "The Date and the Owners of the Esquiline Treasure", American Journal of Archaeology, Vol 89, No. 1, Centennial Issue (Jan., 1985), pp. 135–145, JSTOR
- Carletti, Carlo. "Damaso I". EnciclopediaDeiPapi. Vol. 1. pp. 349–372. santo-damaso-i_(Enciclopedia_dei_Papi)/..
- Celenza, Christopher S. (2021). The Italian Renaissance and the Origin of the Humanities: An Intellectual History, 1400-1800. Cambridge University Press. ISBN 978-1-108-83340-0.
- Cross, Frank Leslie; Livingstone, Elizabeth A., eds. (2005). "Damasus". The Oxford Dictionary of the Christian Church. Oxford University Press. ISBN 978-0-19-280-290-3.
- Green, M., "The Supporters of the Antipope Ursinus," Journal of Theological Studies 22 (1971) pp. 531–538.
- Grig, Lucy, "Portraits, Pontiffs and the Christianization of Fourth-Century Rome", Papers of the British School at Rome, Vol. 72, (2004), pp. 203–230, JSTOR
- Lampe, Peter (2015). "Trace of Peter Veneration in Roman Archaeology". In Bond, Helen K.; Hurtado, Larry W. (eds.). Peter in Early Christianity. William B. Eerdmans Publishing Company. ISBN 978-0-8028-7171-8.304-305
- Lippold, A., "Ursinus und Damasus," Historia 14 (1965), pp. 105–128.
- Löx, Markus: Monumenta sanctorum. Rom und Mailand als Zentren des frühen Christentums: Märtyrerkult und Kirchenbau unter den Bischöfen Damasus und Ambrosius. Wiesbaden, 2013.
- Lutraan, Katherine L., Late Roman Gold-Glass: Images and Inscriptions Archived 4 January 2014 at the Wayback Machine, MA thesis, McMaster University, 2006, available online -"investigates the images and inscriptions that decorate the extant corpus of gold-glass vessel bases".
- Nautin, P. "Le premier échange épistulaire entre Jérôme et Damase: lettres réelles ou fictives?," Freiburger Zeitschrift für Philosophie und Theologie 30, 1983, pp. 331–334.
- Reutter, Ursula: Damasus, Bischof von Rom (366–384). Leben und Werk (= Studien und Texte zu Antike und Christentum. Vol. 55). Mohr Siebeck, Tübingen, 2009, ISBN 978-3-16-149848-0.
- Reynolds, R. E., "An Early Medieval Mass Fantasy: The Correspondence of Pope Damasus and St Jerome on a Nicene Canon," in Proceedings of the Seventh International Congress of Medieval Canon Law, Cambridge, 23–27 July 1984 (ed. P. Linehan) (Città del Vaticano 1988), pp. 73–89.
- Schimmelpfennig, Bernhard: Das Papsttum. Von der Antike bis zur Renaissance. 6th edition. Bibliographically revised and updated by Elke Goez. Wissenschaftliche Buchgesellschaft, Darmstadt, 2009, ISBN 978-3-534-23022-8.
- Seppelt, Franz X.: Geschichte der Päpste von den Anfängen bis zur Mittel des zwanzigsten Jahrhunderts. Vol.: 1: Die Entfaltung der päpstlichen Machtstellung im frühen Mittelalter. Von Gregor dem Grossen bis zur Mitte des elften Jahrhunderts. 2nd newly revised edition (by Georg Schwaiger). Kösel, Munich, 1955, pp. 109–126.
- Sheperd, M. H., "The Liturgical Reform of Damasus," in Kyriakon. Festschrift für Johannes Quasten (ed. Patrick Granfield and J.A. Jungmann) II (Münster 1970) pp. 847–863.
- Taylor, J., "St. Basil the Great and Pope Damasus," Downside Review 91 (1973), pp. 183–203, 261–274.
- Walker, Williston. A History of the Christian Church.

Titles of the Great Christian Church
Preceded by Liberius	Bishop of Rome; 366–384	Succeeded by Siricius
