= Gelasian Decree =

Roman Catholic ecclesiastical text traditionally attributed to Pope Gelasius I

The Gelasian Decree (Latin: Decretum Gelasianum) is a Latin text traditionally thought to be a decretal of the prolific Pope Gelasius I (492–496). The work reached its final form in a five-chapter text written by an anonymous scholar between 519 and 553. The second chapter is a list of books of Scripture defined as part of the biblical canon by a Council of Rome, traditionally dated to Pope Damasus I (366–383) and thus known as the Damasine List. The fifth chapter of the work includes a list of rejected works not encouraged for church use.

In The Carolingians and the Written Word, Rosamond McKitterick wrote:

It appears to have had nothing to do with Gelasius, but instead may be a product of Frankish Gaul. Certainly its earliest manuscript witness, Brussels 9850-2, was produced c. 700 in the Corbie region, possibly in Soissons itself, and given to the abbey of St Medard at Soissons by Abbot Nomedius. The earliest surviving manuscript copy of the full text is Fulda, Bonifatianus 2, written either at Luxeuil itself or by a Luxeuil-trained scribe elsewhere. It should be remembered that both Abbot Nomedius and Corbie itself were connected with the monastic zeal of Queen Balthild, and that Corbie’s first community included monks from Luxeuil.

== Content ==
The Decretum exists in a number of recensions of varying lengths. The longest has five chapters, another recension has the last four of these chapters, another the last three, and another the first three.

=== Chapters ===
1. A list of the seven gifts of the Holy Spirit as attributes of Christ, and of the titles that are applied to Christ
2. A list of the books that make up the Old and New Testament. The Old Testament list contains, in addition to the books of the Hebrew Bible, all of the deuterocanonical books other than Baruch with the Letter of Jeremiah (which however might be subsumed under the Book of Jeremiah). The New Testament list contains the 27 standard books: 4 Gospels, Acts, 14 letters of Paul (including Hebrews), Apocalypse of John, and 7 General Letters (of which 2 and 3 John are attributed to "the other John the elder", and Jude to "Judas the Zealot"). The Decretum's canon of Scripture is thus identical with the Catholic canon issued by the Council of Trent.
3. a short endorsement of the supremacy of the Bishop of Rome over the other bishops, citing the authority of Peter, and a statement of the order of precedence of the three principal episcopal sees: Rome, then Alexandria, then Antioch.
4. a list of writings that are "to be received": the decrees of the first four ecumenical councils, and the writings of the Church Fathers and ecclesiastical writers mentioned in the chapter, varying from famous to obscure (for example Sedulius and Juvencus). Notably, it suggests that while Origen of Alexandria's work can be read, he personally should be rejected as a "schismatic".
5. a list of writings that are "not to be received": many early Christian gospels, acts, apocalypses and similar works that are part of what we know as the New Testament Apocrypha. Mentioned are:
  - the Acts of Andrew, of Thomas, of Peter, of Philip, and of Paul and Thecla.
  - the Gospels of Matthias, of James, of Peter, of Thomas, of Bartholomew, of Andrew, the Syriac Infancy Gospel and the Gospel of Barnabas (not the 16th century Gospel of Barnabas).
  - the Apocalypses of Paul, Thomas, and of Stephen.
  - the Testament of Job, the Apocryphon of Jannes and Jambres, the Lots of the Apostles and the Letters from Jesus to Abgar and from Abgar to Jesus.

=== Attribution ===
The various recensions of the Decretum appear in multiple surviving manuscripts. It is "attributed in many manuscripts to Pope Damasus (366–384). In other and more numerous manuscripts the same decree occurs in an enlarged form assigned within the documents in some cases to Pope Gelasius (492–496), in others to Pope Hormisdas (514–523), and in a few cases the documents are simply anonymous."

==== The Damasine recension ====
The copies of the decree attributed to Damasus are contained in four manuscripts, two dated in the eighth century and two in the ninth. Each decree is headed 'Incipit concilium urbis Romae sub Damaso Papa de explanatione fidei' ["Here begins the Council of Rome under pope Damasus 'On Explaining the Faith'"]. Each consists of three short chapters, the second of which treated 'de scripturis divinis agendis est quid universalis catholica recipiat ecclesia et quid vitare debeat' ["Now indeed the Divine Scriptures must be discussed: what the universal Catholic Church receives and what it should avoid"]. There follows a catalogue of the Old and New Testament books.

In the Damasine recension, there is no mention of pope Gelasius. Though the date of the Roman Council is not mentioned in the Decretum, the view that came to prevail was that it was the council held in 382: "In 1794 F. Arevalo, the editor of Sedulius, started the theory that the first three of these five chapters were really the decrees of a Roman Council held a century earlier than Gelasius, under Damasus, in 382 A.D."

==== The Gelasian recension ====
Another recension contains only the last three chapters and is prefaced by the sentence: "Here begins the decretal 'On books to be received and not to be received' which was written by Pope Gelasius and seventy most erudite bishops at the apostolic seat in the city of Rome". Here the focus is on the books and the Decretum is considered to be a decretal of Pope Gelasius. In the Gelasian recension there is no mention of Pope Damasus and the Council of Rome.

== Traditional view ==
For centuries, the commonly accepted view was that the Decretum Gelasianum was a decretal of pope Gelasius, containing the text of a canon of Scripture originally produced by the Council of Rome under Damasus a century earlier, and that this canon was identical with the Catholic canon issued by the Council of Trent.

For instance, the Oxford Dictionary of the Christian Church, states:

A council probably held at Rome in 382 under St. Damasus gave a complete list of the canonical books of both the Old Testament and the New Testament (also known as the 'Gelasian Decree' because it was reproduced by Gelasius in 495), which is identical with the list given at Trent.

Likewise, Catholic historian William Jurgens writes:

The first part of this decree has long been known as the Decree of Damasus, and concerns the Holy Spirit and the seven-fold gifts. The second part of the decree is more familiarly known as the opening part of the Gelasian Decree, in regard to the canon of Scripture: De libris recipiendis vel non recipiendis. It is now commonly held that the part of the Gelasian Decree dealing with the accepted canon of Scripture is an authentic work of the Council of Rome of 382 A.D. and that Gelasius edited it again at the end of the fifth century, adding to it the catalog of the rejected books, the apocrypha. It is now almost universally accepted that these parts one and two of the Decree of Damasus are authentic parts of the Acts of the Council of Rome of 382 A.D.

Similarly, the Catholic Encyclopedia links the Decree to the Council of Rome of 382 and its definition of the canon:

St. Jerome, a rising light in the Church, though but a simple priest, was summoned by Pope Damasus from the East, where he was pursuing sacred lore, to assist at an eclectic, but not ecumenical, synod at Rome in the year 382. Neither the general council at Constantinople of the preceding year nor that of Nice (365) had considered the question of the Canon. This Roman synod must have devoted itself specially to the matter. The result of its deliberations, presided over, no doubt, by the energetic Damasus himself, has been preserved in the document called "Decretum Gelasii de recipiendis et non recipiendis libris", a compilation partly of the sixth century, but containing much material dating from the two preceding ones. The Damasan catalogue presents the complete and perfect Canon which has been that of the Church Universal ever since.

== Critical view ==
In 1912, Ernst von Dobschütz examined all the manuscripts of the Decretum. Dobschütz showed that the first chapter of the five-chapter recension contains a quotation from a work of Augustine (in Joh. ix 7, Migne, xxxv 146l) written in 416 and therefore the Damasine recension of the Decretum could not be a decree of the Council of Rome held in 382. He also argued that all of the shorter versions are derived from the five-chapter recension and concluded that the Decretum was "no genuine decree or letter either of Damasus or Gelasius, but a pseudonymous literary production of the first half of the sixth century (between 519 and 553)".

In the course of examining the place of the Muratorian fragment in the development of the canon, Geoffrey Mark Hahnemann examined the Decretum Gelasianum and came to similar conclusions. Hahnemann argues against the Decretum originating in Pope Damasus's time based on two arguments:

- Jerome's silence about a canonical list issued by the council of Rome in 382: "It seems highly improbable that, if Jerome, who was probably present at the council and was certainly at Rome, had ever heard of such a pronouncement about canonical books, he should nowhere have mentioned it, or that it should not have qualified his own statements on the Canon. [...] Yet there is no mention or evidence of a change of position in the works of Jerome. The authenticity of at least the catalogue in the Damasine Decree is thus called into question."
- the Damasine Decree not being mentioned as such by any independent document until 840. Most notably, Pope Nicholas I, when discussing the canon in the 9th century, mentions the letter of Innocent I (401–417) but not any decrees by Damasus, which, being earlier, would be more important.

Hahnemann also points out that the later writers of the 9th century who refer to the document under the name of Gelasius or Hormisdas never credit it to Damasus. He also argues that Dionysius Exiguus beginning his collection of Latin canons and decretals with Damasus's successor, Siricius, implies that no pope before Siricius issued decretals.

== Textual history ==
The complete text is preserved in the mid-eighth-century Ragyndrudis Codex, fols. 57r–61v, which is the earliest manuscript copy containing the complete text. The earliest manuscript copy was produced c. 700, Brussels 9850-2.

Versions of the work appear in multiple surviving manuscripts, some of which are titled as a Decretal of Pope Gelasius, others as a work of a Roman Council under the earlier Pope Damasus. However, all versions show signs of being derived from the full five-part text, which contains a quotation from Augustine, writing about 416 after Damasus, which is evidence for the document being later than that.

Little is known of the compiler of the decree, other than perhaps he was of Southern Gallic (modern Southern France) origin.
