= Sortes Astrampsychi =

Fragment of early Sortes text

The Sortes Astrampsychi (Greco-Roman fortune-telling guide

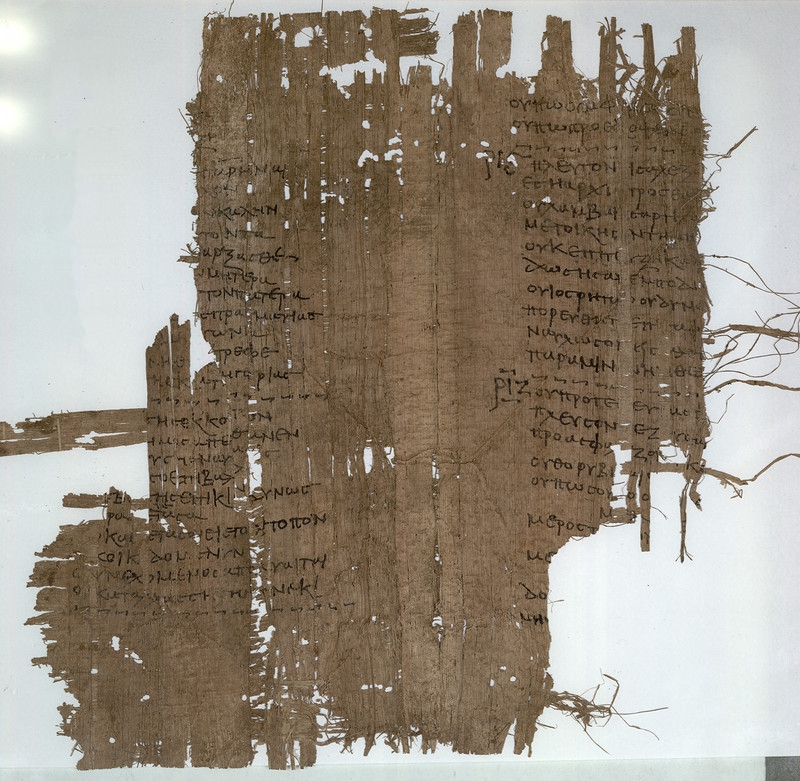
Fragment of early Sortes text

The Sortes Astrampsychi (Oracles of Astrampsychus) was a popular Greco-Roman fortune-telling guide ascribed to Astrampsychus, identified by ancient authors as a magus who lived in Persia before the conquest of Alexander the Great, or an Egyptian sage serving a Ptolemaic king. While other sortes (means of fortune-telling) involved the casting of dice, the Sortes Astrampsychi did not. Instead, a questioner chose a prewritten question, to which a number was assigned; calling on divine inspiration, the questioner then spoke a number from one to ten, which was added to the question number; the oracle-monger then provided one of ten possible replies by consulting a numerical index. The text is known from thirteen papyrus fragments of the third to sixth centuries CE, and from Byzantine manuscripts which date from the fourteenth to sixteenth centuries but are completely preserved. The Byzantine texts add Christian religious elements.

In a preface to the Sortes, the author, identifying himself as "Astrampsychus of Egypt" and addressing his remarks "to King Ptolemy," goes on to claim that the book was actually "an invention of Pythagoras the philosopher," and boasts that "King Alexander of Macedon ruled the world by using this method of deciding matters."

A number of later treatises have been spuriously ascribed to Astrampsychus, including a book on healing donkeys, a guide for interpreting dreams, a discussion of lapidary stones for use in astrology, a work on geomancy, and a volume of love charms.

The first English translation of the Sortes Astrampsychi by Stewart and Morrell was published in 1998 as "The Oracles of Astrampsychus" in Anthology of Ancient Greek Popular Literature; the editor, William Hansen, provides an introduction with details about the history of the document and instructions for its use. In 2006 an edition of the Greek text with a German translation by Kai Brodersen was published as Astrampsychos: Das Pythagoras-Orakel.
