= Cleromancy =

Divination by casting of lots

Cleromancy is a form of divination, involving sortition (casting of lots), in which an outcome is determined by means that normally would be considered random, such as the rolling of dice (astragalomancy), but that are sometimes believed to reveal the will of a deity.

== In classical civilization ==
In ancient Rome, fortunes were told through the casting of lots or sortes.

== In Judaic and Christian tradition ==
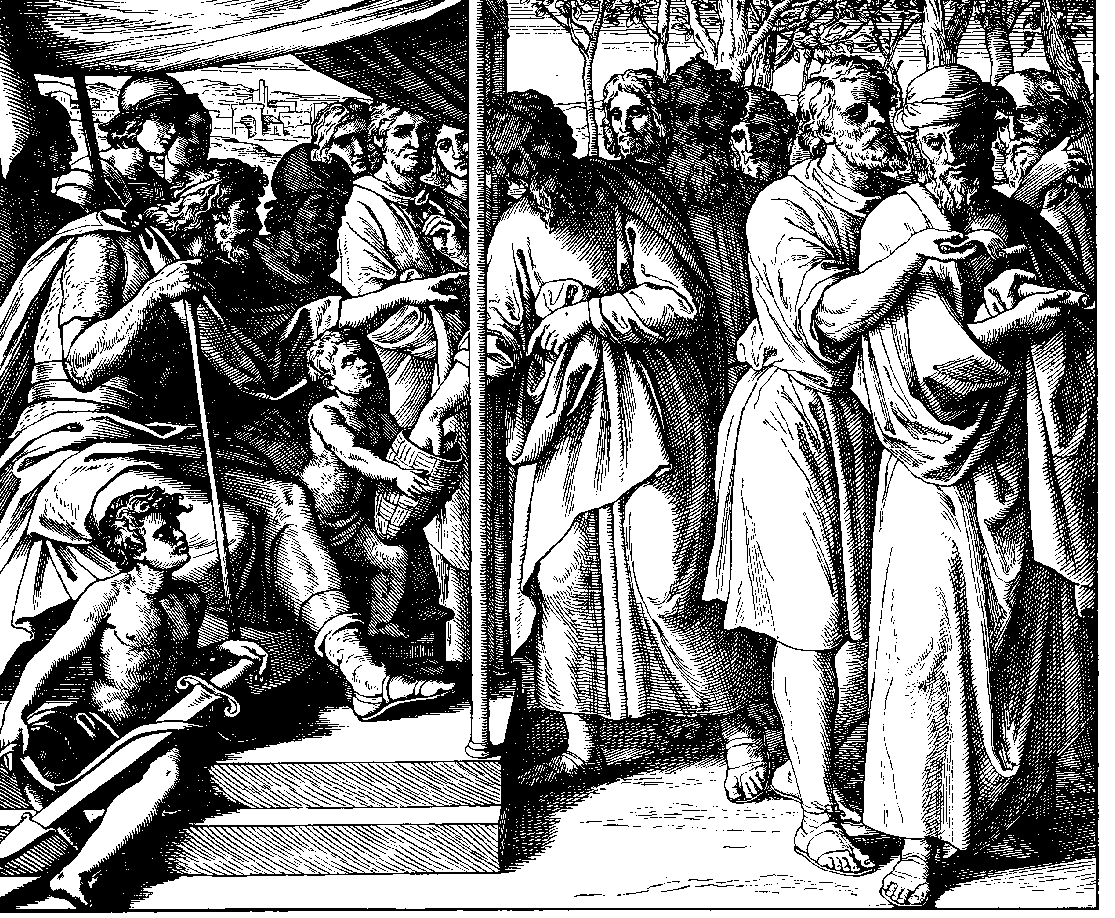
Casting lots for tribal inheritance, woodcut for Die Bibel in Bildern, 1860, Joshua, Chapter 14

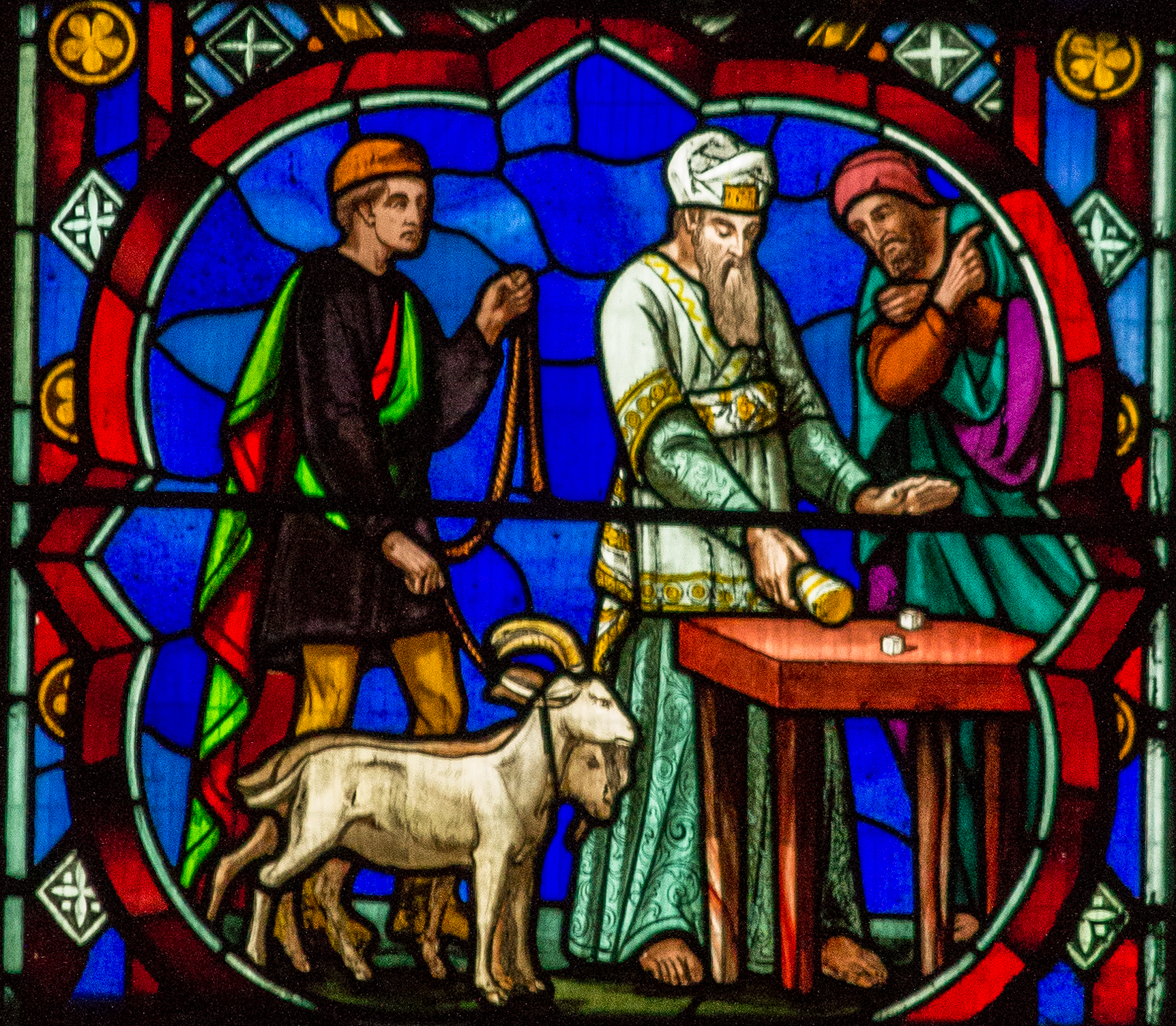
Aaron draws lots to select which of two goats will be the scapegoat. (Leviticus 16:7–10; stained glass from Lincoln Cathedral)

Casting of lots (Hebrew: גּוֹרָל, romanized: gōrāl, Greek: κλῆρος, romanized: klē̂ros) is mentioned 47 times in the Bible. Some examples in the Hebrew Bible of the casting of lots as a means of determining God's will:

- In the Book of Leviticus 16:8, God commanded Moses, "And Aaron shall cast lots upon the two goats; one lot for the LORD, and the other lot for the scapegoat." One goat will be sacrificed as a sin offering, while the scapegoat is loaded up with the sins of the people and sent into the wilderness.
- According to Numbers 26:55, Moses allocated territory to the tribes of Israel according to each tribe's male population and by lot.
- In Joshua 7:14, a guilty party (Achan) is found by lot.
- In the Book of Joshua 18:6, Joshua says, "Ye shall therefore describe the land into seven parts, and bring the description hither to me, that I may cast lots for you here before the LORD our God." The Hebrews took this action to know God's will as to the dividing of the land between the seven tribes of Israel who had not yet "received their inheritance" (Joshua 18:2).
- In the First Book of Samuel 14:42, lots are used to determine that it was Jonathan, Saul's son, who broke the oath that Saul made, "Cursed be the man that eateth any food until evening, that I may be avenged on mine enemies" (1 Samuel 14:24).
- In the Book of Jonah 1:7, the desperate sailors cast lots to see whose god was responsible for creating the storm: "Then the sailors said to each other, 'Come, let us cast lots to find out who is responsible for this calamity.' They cast lots and the lot fell on Jonah."

Other places in the Hebrew Bible relevant to divination include:

- Book of Proverbs 16:33: "The lot is cast into the lap, but its every decision is from Yahweh" and 18:18: "The lot settles disputes, and keeps strong ones apart."
- Book of Leviticus 19:26 KJV "... neither shall you practice enchantment, nor observe times." The original Hebrew word for enchantment, as found in Strong's Concordance, is pronounced naw-khash'. The translation given by Strong's is "to practice divination, divine, observe signs, learn by experience, diligently observe, practice fortunetelling, take as an omen"; and "1. to practice divination 2. to observe the signs or omens". Times in the original Hebrew is pronounced aw-nan'. Its translation in Strong's is "to make appear, produce, bring (clouds), to practise soothsaying, conjure;" and "1. to observe times, practice soothsaying or spiritism or magic or augury or witchcraft 2. soothsayer, enchanter, sorceress, diviner, fortune-teller, barbarian...". In the Hebrew-Interlinear Bible, the verse reads, "not you shall augur and not you shall consult cloud".
- Deuteronomy 18:10 "let no one be found among you who [qasam qesem], performs [onan], [nahash], or [kashaph]". qasam qesem literally means distributes distributions, and may possibly refer to cleromancy. Kashaph seems to mean mutter, although the Septuagint renders the same phrase as pharmakia (poison), so it may refer to magic potions.
- In the Book of Esther, Haman casts lots to decide the date on which to exterminate the Jews of Shushan; the Jewish festival of Purim commemorates the subsequent chain of events.
- In I Chronicles 26:13 guard duties are assigned by lot.
- To Christian doctrine, perhaps the most significant ancient Hebrew mention of lots occurs in the Book of Psalms, 22:18 "They divide my garments among them, and for my clothing they cast lots." This came to be regarded as a prophecy connecting that psalm and the one that follows to the crucifixion and resurrection of Jesus, since all four gospels (for example, John 19:24) tell of the Roman soldiers at Jesus's crucifixion casting lots to see who would take possession of his clothing. That final act of profanation became the central theme of The Robe, a 1953 film starring Richard Burton.

A notable example in the New Testament occurs in the Acts of the Apostles 1:23–26 where the eleven remaining apostles cast lots to determine whether to select Matthias, or Barsabbas (surnamed Justus) to replace Judas.

The Eastern Orthodox Church still occasionally uses this method of selection. In 1917, Metropolitan Tikhon became Patriarch of Moscow by the drawing of lots. The Coptic Orthodox Church uses drawing lots to choose the Coptic pope, most recently done in November 2012 to choose Pope Tawadros II. German Pietist Christians in the 18th century often followed the New Testament precedent of drawing lots to determine the will of God. They often did so by selecting a random Bible passage. The most extensive use of drawing of lots in the Pietist tradition may have come with Count von Zinzendorf and the Moravian Brethren of Herrnhut, who drew lots for many purposes, including selection of church sites, approval of missionaries, the election of bishops, and many others. This practice was greatly curtailed after the General Synod of the worldwide Moravian Unity in 1818 and finally discontinued in the 1880s. Many Amish customarily select ordinary preachers by lot. (Note that the Greek word for "lot" (kleros) serves as the etymological root for English words like "cleric" and "clergy" as well as for "cleromancy".)

== In Germania ==
Tacitus, in Chapter X of his Germania (circa 98 AD), describes casting lots as a practice used by the Germanic tribes. He states:

To divination and casting of lots, they pay attention beyond any other people. Their method of casting lots is a simple one: they cut a branch from a fruit-bearing tree and divide it into small pieces which they mark with certain distinctive signs and scatter at random onto a white cloth. Then, the priest of the community if the lots are consulted publicly, or the father of the family if it is done privately, after invoking the gods and with eyes raised to heaven, picks up three pieces, one at a time, and interprets them according to the signs previously marked upon them.

In the ninth century Anskar, a Frankish missionary and later bishop of Hamburg-Bremen, observed the same practice several times in the decision-making process of the Danish peoples. In this version, the chips were believed to determine the support or otherwise of gods, whether Christian or Norse, for a course of action or act. For example, in one case a Swedish man feared he had offended a god and asked a soothsayer to cast lots to find out which god. The soothsayer determined that the Christian god had taken offence; the Swede later found a book that his son had stolen from Bishop Gautbert in his house.

== In Asian culture ==
In ancient China, and especially in Chinese folk religion, various means of divination through random means are employed, such as qiúqiān (求簽). In Japan, omikuji is one form of drawing lots.

I Ching divination, which dates from early China, has played a major role in Chinese culture and philosophy for more than two thousand years. The I Ching tradition descended in part from the oracle bone divination system that was used by rulers in the Shang dynasty, and grew over time into a rich literary wisdom tradition that was closely tied to the philosophy of yin and yang. I Ching practice is widespread throughout East Asia, and commonly involves the use of coins or (traditionally) sticks of yarrow.

In South India, the custom of ritualistically tossing sea shells (sozhi) and interpreting the results based on the positions of the shells is prevalent, predominantly in the state of Kerala.

== In West African culture ==
In Yoruba and Yoruba-inspired religions, babalawos use variations on a common type of cleromancy called Ifá divination. Ifá divination is performed by "pounding ikin"—transferring consecrated oil palm kernels from one hand to another to create a pattern of eight to sixteen marks called "Odù" onto a tray of iyerosun, or consecrated termite dust from the Irosun tree. The casting itself is called Dafá in Yoruba language speaking areas in West Africa. Similar to I Ching, this form of divination forms a binary-like series of eight broken or unbroken pairs. This allows for 256 combinations, each of which references sets of tonal poems that contain a structure that includes various issues, problems and adversities and the prescriptions of offerings to correct them.

== In Mi'kmaq tradition ==
The game of Waltes is a form of cleromancy practiced by traditional Mi'kmaq and preserved since colonial potlache law, the Indian Act and residential schools in Canada. It is played with a bowl, six bone dice, and a counting stick. Three sticks are grandmothers and one the grandfather.

== See also ==
- Astragalomancy
- List of spirituality-related topics
- Magic 8 Ball
- Urim and Thummim
- John Cage
- Sortition
