= Apocalypse of Stephen =

New testament apocryphal text

The Revelation of Stephen, or Apocalypse of Stephen, is a text of New Testament apocrypha. It features Saint Stephen, one of the Seven Deacons to the Twelve Apostles.

== Summary ==
The text describes a conflict at the very beginnings of Christianity about the nature of Jesus of Nazareth. Stephen appears on the scene and recounts Revelation as a literal truth, to which the crowd declares blasphemy, and Caiaphas has him arrested and beaten.

The text then has Stephen appear before Pontius Pilate, whom he tells to not speak, and orders him to recognize Jesus. The tale is set before Paul of Tarsus' conversion, and so it proceeds to describe how Paul persecutes Stephen by having him crucified. However, an angel rescues Stephen, so Saul/Paul has molten lead poured into his mouth and ears, and nails into his heart and feet, but an angel heals him again.

The next day, the text proclaims that Stephen was led out to be judged before the crowd, but instead Stephen recounts a supposed prophecy by Nathan of Jesus's coming, which annoys the guards to the extent that they bind him and take him to the head of the guard. The Sanhedrin decide that Stephen should be stoned, but Nicodemus and Gamaliel (the Jewish scholar) try to defend him with their bodies, dying in the process.

After ten hours, Stephen eventually dies, and is buried in a silver coffin by Pilate, against Stephen's wishes. An angel moves the body to where Stephen wished to be buried, leaving Pilate shocked by the loss of the bodies. Pilate then receives a vision of Stephen and converts. Likewise, the memory of Stephen is said by the text to have made Paul convert.

== Analysis ==
Many scholars think that Pilate was a later addition to the text, with his involvement in the story looking somewhat clumsy, and the text being primarily an attempt to explain Paul's motives for conversion, but also his prior villainy. Furthermore, most scholars agree that Pontius Pilate was no longer the Prefect of Judaea by the time of Stephen's martyrdom, having been recalled to Rome and replaced by acting prefect Marcellus.

The Apocalypse of Stephen was not accepted in the Christian canon. The sixth century Gelasian Decree rejects it as apocryphal.
