= Barry McCrea =

Irish writer and academic (born 1974)

Barry McCrea is an Irish writer and academic. He grew up in Dalkey, County Dublin, and was educated at the Dalkey School Project, Gonzaga College, and Trinity College, Dublin (1993–1997) where he studied French and Spanish literature. He was elected a Foundation Scholar. He received a Ph.D. from Princeton University in 2004. He taught Comparative Literature at Yale University, where he was appointed full professor in 2012. He holds a chair in literature at the University of Notre Dame.

His novel The First Verse was published by Carroll & Graf in 2005. It was awarded the 2006 Ferro-Grumley Prize for fiction, and nominated for an American Library Association award. The plot explores the concept of the Sortes Virgilianae.

The First Verse was a bestseller in Spanish, published as Literati (DestinoLibro, 2006) and in German as Die Poeten der Nacht (Aufbau, 2008).

His academic book Languages of the Night won the René Wellek prize for best book of 2016.

== Bibliography ==
- The First Verse (2005)
- In the Company of Strangers: Family and Narrative in Dickens, Conan Doyle, Joyce and Proust (2011)
- Languages of the Night: Minor Languages and the Literary Imagination in 20th-Century Ireland and Europe (2015)
