= Lots of the Apostles =

Several texts used in Christian divination

Lots of the Apostles (Latin: Sortes Apostolorum) is the name of several texts used in Christian divination, based on the Acts of the Apostles 1:26, which describes how the Apostles cast lots to select a replacement for Judas Iscariot.

The earliest reference to the Lots of the Apostles is found in the 6th-century Gelasian Decree, a Latin work from southern Gaul or northern Italy. It lists a Liber qui appellatur Sortes apostolorum, 'book which is called lots of the Apostles', among the New Testament apocrypha. The identity of this text is uncertain. It may be a reference to the Sortes Sanctorum, but this work is not otherwise called Sortes Apostolorum prior to the 13th century. In late antiquity, another text called Lots of the Apostles circulated in Syriac. Around 700, Jacob of Edessa in his canons forbade monks "to take answers ... from the Lots called the Apostles." He issued a similar rule in answering a question of Addai the Priest.

The identity of the work condemned by Jacob is also uncertain. It may be the Syriac work of the same title preserved in a 19th-century manuscript now in London, British Library, MS Or. 4434, at folios 41v–46v. This work contains 34 potential answers. There is also a Greek text entitled Lots of the Holy Apostles preserved in three manuscripts from the 15th to 17th centuries. It contains 87 answers. Neither of these texts can be securely identified with the ones condemned by the Gelasian Decree or Jacob.

== Bibliography ==
- Furlani, Giuseppe (1922–1923). "Una recensione siriaca delle Sortes apostolorum". Atti del Reale Istituto Veneto di Scienze, Lettere ed Arti. 82 (2): 357–363.
- Klingshirn, William E. (2002). "Defining the Sortes Sanctorum: Gibbon, Du Cange, and Early Christian Lot Divination". Journal of Early Christian Studies. 10 (1): 77–130.
- Luijendijk, AnneMarie; Klingshirn, William E. (2018). "The Literature of Lot Divination". In AnneMarie Luijendijk; William E. Klingshirn (eds.). Sortilege and Its Practitioners in Late Antiquity: My Lots Are in Thy Hands. Brill. pp. 19–59.
- Tannous, Jack B. (2018). The Making of the Medieval Middle East: Religion, Society, and Simple Believers. Princeton University Press.
