= Sortes Homericae =

Type of divination by bibliomancy

The Sortes Homericae (Latin for "Homeric lots"), a type of divination by bibliomancy, involved drawing a random sentence or line from the works of Homer (usually the Iliad) to answer a question or to predict the future. In the Roman world it co-existed with the various forms of the sortes, such as the Sortes Virgilianae and their Christian successor the Sortes Sanctorum.

There are numerous examples of lines from the Iliad being premonitions of things to come. Socrates reportedly dreamed of a certain verse from the Iliad, and interpreted it as foretelling the day of his execution. Before the Battle of Pharsalus, a verse of Homer occurred to Brutus which suggested that Pompey would be defeated. The emperor Marcus Opellius Macrinus (r. 217–218) is known to have used sortes Homericae properly speaking, where a verse was chosen by lot that supposedly foretold his fate that he would not last long on the imperial throne.

== Homer Oracle ==
The "Homer Oracle", or Homeromanteion, was a method of divination preserved in Greek Magical Papyrus VII, Oxyrhynchus Papyrus 56.3831, and Papyrus Bononienses 3. The oracle consisted of excerpts from Homer's poetry sorted by triple digits. After a series of ritual preparations, the user rolls a die three times, consulting a verse according to the resultant number for a total of 216 possible results. PMG VII. 1–148 as preserved is given in the Oxford Classical Text translations:

PMG VII. 1–148 The Homer Oracle:
Line	Roll	Lot	Reference
1.	1-1-1	But on account of their accursed bellies they have miserable woes,	Od. 15.344
2.	1-1-2	neither to cast anchor stones nor to attach stern cables,	Od. 9.137
3.	1-1-3	being struck by the sword, and the water was becoming red with blood.	Il. 21.21
4.	1-1-4	...	...
5.	1-1-5	stood holding a scepter, which Hephaistos produced by his labors.	Il. 2.101
6.	1-1-6	...	...
7.	1-2-1	amends I wish to make and to give a boundless ransom.	Il. 9.120; 19.138
8.	1-2-2	surely then the gods themselves have mined your mind.	Il. 7.360; 12.234
9.	1-2-3	...	...
10.	1-2-4	...	...
11.	1-2-5	be let it lie in the great hall. And I wish for your happy arrival	Od. 15.128
12.	1-2-6	...	...
13.	1-3-1	...	...
14.	1-3-2	...	...
15.	1-3-3	But Zeus does not accomplish for men all their purposes.	Il. 18.328
16.	1-3-4	I would even wish it, and it would be much better	Il. 3.41; Od. 11.358; 20.316
17.	1-3-5	Then indeed would he smash all your fine show,	Od. 17.244
18.	1-3-6	I also care about all these things, woman. But very terribly	Il. 6.441
19.	1-4-1	...	...
20.	1-4-2	speaking good things, but they were contriving evil things in their hearts.	Od. 17.66
21.	1-4-3	The glorious gifts of the gods are surely not to be cast aside,	Il. 3.65
22.	1-4-4	...	...
23.	1-4-5	...	...
24.	1-4-6	These things, Zeus-nurtured Skamander, will be as you order.	Il. 21.223
25.	1-5-1	a joy to your enemies, and a disgrace to yourself?	Il. 3.51
26.	1-5-2	Within this very year, Odysseus will arrive here,	Od. 14.161; 19.306
27.	1-5-3	No use indeed to you, since you will not lie clad in them,	Il. 22.513
28.	1-5-4	And to the victor are to go the woman and the possessions.	Il. 3.255
29.	1-5-5	the rule of the many is no good. Let there be one ruler.	Il. 2.204
30.	1-5-6	And the gateway is full of ghosts, and full also is the courtyard,	Od. 20.355
31.	1-6-1	We have won great honor. We have killed glorious Hektor,	Il. 22.393
32.	1-6-2	Who would undertake and complete this task for ?	Il. 10.303
33.	1-6-3	Not even if his gifts to me should be as numerous as the grains of sand and panicles of dust,	Il. 9.385
34.	1-6-4	...	...
35.	1-6-5	...	...
36.	1-6-6	...	...
37.	2-1-1	For no island is made for driving horses or has broad meadows,	Od. 4.607
38.	2-1-2	in the past, when you were boys, did you listen to your	Od. 4.688
39.	2-1-3	...	...
40.	2-1-4	...	...
41.	2-1-5	...	...
42.	2-1-6	His gifts are hateful to me, and I honor him not a whit.	Il. 9.378
43.	2-2-1	an only beloved heir to many possessions,	Il. 9.482; Od. 16.19 (?)
44.	2-2-2	...	...
45.	2-2-3	...	...
46.	2-2-4	...	...
47.	2-2-5	So they thronged about him. And near	Od. 24.19
48.	2-2-6	and fashioning lies out of what nobody could see.	Od. 11.366
49.	2-3-1	be valiant, that later generations may also speak well of you.	Od. 1.302
50.	2-3-2	leaning on the grave marker over a barrow heaped up by men	Il. 11.171
51.	2-3-3	go. You have a way, and beside the sea your ships	Il. 9.43
52.	2-3-4	You will be proved a liar, and will not go on to fulfill your word.	Il. 19.107
53.	2-3-5	And his mother for her part continued the lament amid a flood of tears,	Il. 22.79
54.	2-3-6	Not even if remaining for five or six years	Od. 3.115
55.	2-4-1	So he spoke, and ordered Paion to administer a cure.	Il. 5.899
56.	2-4-2	These things, unhappy man, will I accomplish and do for you.	Od. 11.80
57.	2-4-3	How can you propose to render toil useless and ineffectual?	Il. 4.26
58.	2-4-4	a thing delayed, late of fulfillment, whose fame will never perish.	Il. 2.325
59.	2-4-5	Sooner would you grow weary and return to your native land.	Od. 3.117
60.	2-4-6	to go, that he may bring poisonous drugs from there,	Od. 2.329
61.	2-5-1	Husband, you departed from life young, and me behind as a widow	Il. 24.725
62.	2-5-2	in which way I will for sure accomplish everything and how it will be brought to pass,	Il. 9.310 (?)
63.	2-5-3	Offer me not honey-tempered wine, honored mother,	Il. 6.264
64.	2-5-4	...	...
65.	2-5-5	...	...
66.	2-5-6	Do not orphan your son and make your wife a widow.	Il. 6.432
67.	1-6-1	would that they might now eat their last and final meal here.	Od. 4.685
68.	2-6-2	It is not meet for a man who speaks in the Council to sleep all the night through,	Il. 2.24
69.	2-6-3	What's wrong with you, that you took this wrath into your heart?	Il. 6.326
70.	2-6-4	But who knows if he will one day return and punish them for their violent deeds?	Od. 3.216
71.	2-6-5	wives I will provide for both and furnish possessions	Od. 21.214
72.	2-6-6	we may try the bow and complete the contest.	Od. 21.180
73.	3-1-1	For it's no reproach to flee evil, nor by night.	Il. 14.80
74.	3-1-2	Be mindful of every form of valor. Now you needs must	Il. 22.268
75.	3-1-3	as a widow at home. And the boy is still just a baby,	Il. 22.484; cf. 24.726
76.	3-1-4	But do you in no wise enter the moil of Ares,	Il. 18.134
77.	3-1-5	For amid misfortune mortals quickly grow old.	Od. 19.360
78.	3-1-6	...	...
79.	3-2-1	...	...
80.	3-2-2	Such a man is not alive nor will be born,	Od. 6.201
81.	3-2-3	Of a truth, child, there's nothing really wrong with this,	Il. 18.128
82.	3-2-4	Now is it no longer possible for him to find escape from us,	Il. 22.219
83.	3-2-5	we will ransom with bronze and gold, for it is within.	Il. 22.50
84.	3-2-6	drink, and do not vie with younger men.	Od. 21.310
85.	3-1-1	where are you fleeing, turning your back like a craven in the ranks?	Il. 8.94
86.	3-3-2	Would that such a man be called my husband	Od. 6.244
87.	3-3-3	plants her head in heaven and walks upon the earth.	Il. 4.443
88.	3-4-4	But Zeus does not accomplish for men all their purposes.	Il. 18.328
89.	3-3-5	and nodded for his army to survive and not to perish.	Il. 8.246
90.	3-3-6	Would that you had not pled with the noble son of Peleus,	Il. 9.698
91.	3-4-1	Honey-sweet wine has the best of you, which others also	Od. 21.293
92.	3-4-2	Act in whatever way your mind is moved, and no longer hold back.	Il. 22.185
93.	3-4-3	For it is fated for both to turn the same ground red	Il. 18.329
94.	3-4-4	keep on shooting like this, if haply you mar become a light to the Danaans	Il. 8.282
95.	3-4-5	as there is no one who could keep the dogs off your head,	Il. 22.348
96.	3-4-6	You will not kill me, since I am for sure not subject to Fate.	Il. 22.13
97.	3-5-1	staying right here you would help me watch over this house	Od. 5.208
98.	3-5-2	Get out of the gateway, old man, or it won't be long before you're dragged out by the foot.	Od. 18.10
99.	3-5-3	Better for a man to escape evil by flight than to be caught.	I/. 14.81
100.	3-5-4	and declare to no one, neither man nor woman,	Od. 13.308
101.	3-5-5	of wheat or barley. And the heaps fall thick and fast.	Il. 11.69
102.	3-5-6	Whatever sort of word you speak, such would you hear.	IL.20.250]
103.	3-6-1	was opposed to giving Helen to tawny Menelaos,	Il. 11.125
104.	3-6-2	or will you alter your purpose? The hearts of the good are flexible.	Il. 15.203
105.	3-6-3	Yet I for one never doubted, but at heart	Od. 13.339
106.	3-6-4	Eurpachos, it will not be so. And even you know it.	Od. 21.257
107.	3-6-5	You miserable foreigner, you have no sense at all.	Od. 21.288
108.	3-6-6	And the father granted him one thing, but denied him the other.	Il. 16.250
109.	4-1-1	Nay, go to your chambers and tend to your own work,	Od. 1.356
110.	4-1-2	Now then, do not even tell this to your wife.	Od. 11.224 (alternate version)
111.	4-1-3	would you have been stoned to death for all the wrongs you've done.	Il. 3.57
112.	4-1-4	you prayed to the immortals to see with a beard grown.	Od. 18.176
113.	4-1-5	and vow to Lycian-born Apollo the famous archer	Il. 4.101
114.	4-1-6	and no spirit of harmony unites wolves and sheep,	Il. 22.263)
115.	4-2-1	Come now, let us make these concessions to one another,	11.4.62]
116.	4-2-2	And in the throng were Strife and Uproar, and Fate-of-Death,	Il. 18.535
117.	4-2-3	...	...
118.	4-2-4	Up, rush into battle, the man you have always claimed to be.	Il. 4.264
119.	4-2-5	...	...
120.	4-2-6	You baby, what use now to keep your bow idle?	Il. 21.474
121.	4-3-1	For even fair-tressed Niobe turned her mind to food,	Il. 24.602
122.	4-3-2	after giving a mass of bronze and gold and raiment	Od. 5.38
123.	4-3-3	Surely then the journey will not be useless or fail to occur.	Od. 2.273
124.	4-3-4	One omen is best, to defend your country.	Il. 12.243
125.	4-3-5	I will gild her horns all round and sacrifice her to you.	Il. 10.294
126.	4-3-6	and you would gain every Trojan's thanks and praise,	Il. 4.95
127.	4-4-1	put in with your ship, sillee women are no longer trustworthy.	Od. 11.456
128.	4-4-2	It is not possible or proper to deny your request.	Il. 14.212
129.	4-4-3	would straighrway fit his will to your desire and mine.	Il. 15.52
130.	4-4-4	and give him instruction. And it will be beneficial for him to obey.	Il. 11.7x9
131.	4-4-5	will give glory to me, and your soul to horse-famed Hades.	Il. 5.654
132.	4-4-6	fill up his ship with gold and bronze aplenty,	Il. 9.137
133.	4-5-1	but tell one part, arid let the other be concealed.	Od. 11.443
134.	4-5-2	and at birth Zeus sends a weight of misery.	Il. 10.71
135.	4-5-3	alone to have intelligence, but they are flitting shades.	Od. 10.495
136.	4-5-4	yielding to his indignation. But they now withheld from him the gifts	Il. 9.598
137.	4-5-5	I rejoice at hearing what you say, son of Laertes.	Il. 19.185
138.	4-5-6	But Zeus causes men's prowess to wax or to wane,	Il. 20.242
139.	4-6-1	a terrible man. He would be quick to blame even the blameless.	Il. 11.654
140.	4-6-2	with all haste. For now would you capmre the broad-wayed city	Il. 2.66
141.	4-6-3	Endure now, my heart. An even greater outrage did you once endure,	Od. 20.18
142.	4-6-4	You lunatic, sit still and listen to the word of others,	Il. 2.200
143.	4-6-5	had cast aside wrath and chosen friendship.	Il. 16.282
144.	4-6-6	so good it is for a son to be left by a dead	Od. 3.196
145.	5-1-1	Here then, spread under your chest a veil,	Od. 5.346
146.	5-1-2	'Tis impiety to exult over men slain.	Od. 22.412
147.	5-1-3	through immortal night, when other mortals sleep?	Il. 24.363
148.	5-1-4	How then could I forget divine Odysseus?	Od. 1.65
149.	5-1-5	lurid death and o'erpowering doom laid hold of	Il. 5.83
150.	5-1-6	So there's nothing else as horrible and vile as a woman	Od. 11.427
151.	5-2-1	Let u? not advance to fight the Danaans around the ships.	Il. 12.216
152.	5-2-2	to put up a defense, when some fellow provokes a fight.	Il. 24.369; Od. 16.72; 21.133
153.	5-2-3	nor do children at his knees call him "papa"	Il. 5.408
154.	5-2-4	I am this very man, back home now. And after many toils	Od. 21.207
155.	5-2-5	Talk not like this. there'll be no change before	Il. 5.218
156.	5-2-6	let him stay here the while, even though he's eager for Ares.	Il 19.189
157.	5-3-1	And do not, exulting in war and battle,	Il. 16.91
158.	5-3-2	never to have gone to bed with her and had intercourse,	Il. 9.133; 19.176
159.	5-3-3	and moistens the lips, but fails to moisten the palate.	Il. 22.495
160.	5-3-4	Take heart! Let these matters not trouble your thoughts.	Il. 18.463
161.	5-3-5	But this mad dog I'm unable to hit.	Il. 8.299
162.	5-3-6	Keep quiet, friend, and do as I say.	Il. 4.412
163.	5-4-1	Bad deeds don't prosper. The slow mall for sure overtakes the swift,	Od. 8.329
164.	5-4-2	They shut fast and locked the doors of the hall.	Od. 21.236
165.	5-4-3	Ah, poor man! Death's not at all on your mind,	Il. 17.201
166.	5-4-4	Odysseus has come and reached home, though he was long in coming.	Od. 23.7
167.	5-4-5	in full he will accomplish it at last, and the penalty they pay is great,	I1. 4.161
168.	5-4-6	and therein was Strife, and therein Valor, and therein chilling Attack,	Il. 5.740
169.	5-5-1	but 'tis most wretched to die and meet one's doom by starvation.	Od. 12.342
170.	5-5-2	shall I be laid low when I die. But good repute is now my goal,	Il. 18.121
171.	5-5-3	Up, rush into battle, the man you have always claimed to be.	Il. 4.264
172.	5-5-4	In no way do I mock you, dear child, nor am I playing tricks.	Od. 23.26
173.	5-5-5	but she stayed Alkmene's labor and stopped her from giving birth.	Il. 19.119
174.	5-5-6	But come, and hereafter I shall make amends for this, if now anything wrong	Il. 4.362
175.	5-6-1	Where are you two rushing? What causes the heart within your breast to rage?	Il. 8.413
176.	5-6-2	Pray now, let him not be too much on your mind.	Od. 13.421
177.	5-6-3	But the gods do not, I ween, give men all things at the same time.	Il. 4.320
178.	5-6-4	Talk not like this. There'll be no change before	Il. 5.218
179.	5-6-5	So he spake, but did not move the mind of Zeus by saying this.	Il. 12.173
180.	5-6-6	but Odysseus nodded no and checked him in his eagerness.	Od. 21.129
181.	6-1-1	How can you want to go alone to the ships of the Achaians?	Il. 24.203
182.	6-1-2	him a bridegroom in his house, who left as only child a daughter	Od. 7.65
183.	6-1-3	And too, I've taken the mist from your eyes, which before was there,	Il. 5.127
184.	6-1-4	we may try the bow and complete the contest.	Od. 21.180
185.	6-1-5	And I know that my arrival was longed for by you two	Od. 21.209
186.	6-1-6	I shall dress him in a mantle and a tunic, fine garments.	Od. 16.79; 17.550; 21.339
187.	6-2-1	by fastening a noose sheer from a high rafter,	Od. 11.278
188.	6-2-2	remembering our excellence, of the sort that even we	Od 8.244
189.	6-2-3	the sea's great expanse they cross, since this is the Earthshaker's gift to them.	Od. 7.35
190.	6-2-4	Nay, come on with the bow. You'll soon be sorry for obeying everybody.	Od. 21.369
191.	6-2-5	But hurry into battle, and rouse the other soldiers.	Il. 19.139
192.	6-2-6	For mighty Herakles, not even he escaped his doom,	Il. 18.117
193.	6-3-1	amends I wish to make and to give a boundless ransom.	Il. 9.120; 19.138
194.	6-3-2	And let him stand up among the Argives and swear an oath to you	Il. 19.175
195.	6-3-3	The man is nearby. Our search will not be long, if you are willing	Il. 14.110
196.	6-3-4	and not quite suddenly, and a very god should be the cause?	Od. 21.196
197.	6-3-5	Verily, these things have already happened, and not otherwise could	Il. 14.53
198.	6-3-6	On now, follow close! In action numbers make a difference.	Il. 12.412
199.	6-4-1	surely then the gods themselves have ruined your mind.	Il. 7.360; 12.234
200.	6-4-2	Take heart, and let your thoughts not be of death.	Il. 10.383)
201.	6-4-3	by her wailing she rouse from sleep her household servants,	XI. 5.413
202.	6-4-4	Come now in strict silence, and I shall lead the way,	Od. 7.30
203.	6-4-5	are there ears for hearing, and sense and respect are dead.	Il. 15.129
204.	6-4-6	as he was growing old. But the son did not grow old in his father's armor.	Il. 17.197
205.	6-5-1	to return home and behold the day of homecoming.	Od. 5.220; 8.4663
206.	6-5-2	Apollo of the silver bow did strike the one, still sonless,	Od. 7.64
207.	6-5-3	then you may hope to see your loved ones and reach	Od. 7.76
208.	6-5-4	As for you two, I will tell you exactly how it will be.	Od. 21.212
209.	6-5-5	For so shall I proclaim, and it will be accomplished too.	Il. 1.212
210.	6-5-6	and I shall send him wherever his heart and spirit urge him.	Od. 16.81; 21.342
211.	6-6-1	idiot? You'll soon pay when the swift hounds devour you	Od. 21.363
212.	6-6-2	You would learn what mighty hands I have to back me up.	Od. 20.237; 21.202
213.	6-6-3	In no wise do I think he will in that event take you for himself, nor is it proper.	Od. 21.322
214.	6-6-4	here we gather, waiting day after day.	Od. 21.156
215.	6-6-5	to reach decision making secret plans. Nor yet now to me	Il. 1.542
216.	6-6-6	Don't dare get it into your mind to escape from me, Dolon.	Il. 10.447
Here end the verses of the Homer oracle. May it help you!

== Sources ==
- Gargantua and Pantagruel, Book 3, from "The Complete Works of Francois Rabelais", p285
