= Council of Vannes =

The Council of Vannes, also known as the Council of Veneticum, was a Christian provincial council in the year 465. Perpetuus of Tours presided.

Bishops in attendance included Nunechius, bishop of Nantes; Athenius, bishop of Rennes; and Albinus and Liberalis, possibly from Quimper and Aleth. The council elected Padarn as bishop of Vannes.

== Legislation ==
The council, which continued discussion of topics from the 461 Council of Tours, passed a total of sixteen canons. It regulated monastic and clerical life, passing the earliest known legislation on cenobitic monasticism in Western Christianity.

The canons passed by the council called for ecclesiastical law and order and for separate ecclesiastical courts. Clerics were banned from attending secular courts, attending wedding parties with music or dancing, missing morning hymns, or becoming intoxicated. In addition, the council banned the use of the Sortes Sanctorum, a form of Christian divination.

Clerics were also banned from sharing meals with Jews. The council argued that since Jews refused to eat Christian food, eating Jewish food would position the clerics as inferior to Jews. This ban set an early precedent for an ongoing tradition of bans on interfaith dining.

Among the laity, the council reiterated the existing ban on murderers receiving the Eucharist. It also excommunicated men who remarried after a secular divorce, unless they could prove that their wife had committed adultery.
