= Sortes Vergilianae =

Form of divination by bibliomancy

The Sortes Vergilianae (Virgilian Lots) is a form of divination by bibliomancy in which advice or predictions of the future are sought by interpreting passages from the works of the Roman poet Virgil. The use of Virgil for divination may date to as early as the second century AD, and is part of a wider tradition that associated the poet with magic. The system seems to have been modeled on the ancient Roman sortes as seen in the Sortes Homericae, and later the Sortes Sanctorum.

== History ==
=== Classical instances ===
Sir Philip Sidney's Defence of Poesie describes Roman beliefs about poetry and recounts a famous Sors Vergiliana by Decimus Clodius Albinus, a Roman who ruled Britain and laid claim to the Roman Empire, but was defeated in battle by Septimius Severus:

Among the Romans a poet was called vates, which is as much as a diviner, foreseer, or prophet, as by his conjoined words, vaticinium and vaticinari, is manifest; so heavenly a title did that excellent people bestow upon this heart-ravishing knowledge. And so far were they carried into the admiration thereof, that they thought in the chanceable hitting upon any such verses great fore-tokens of their following fortunes were placed; whereupon grew the word of Sortes Virgilianae, when by sudden opening Virgil's book they lighted upon some verse of his making. Whereof the Histories of the Emperors' Lives are full: as of Albinus, the governor of our island, who in his childhood met with this verse,

Arma amens capio, nec sat rationis in armis,

and in his age performed it.

Other recorded Roman instances of the practice are by

- Hadrian – drew Aeneid 6, 808, taken as predicting his adoption by Trajan and succession to the imperial throne
- Alexander Severus – drew Aeneid 6, 851, taken as predicting his later becoming emperor
- Gordian II – drew Aeneid 1, 278 when concerned as to whether he would have a long line of successors or not, taken as predicting the former
- Claudius II – drew Aeneid 1, 265, apparently predicting he would rule for three more years (he in fact only ruled for two); consulting as to whether his brother Quintillus should be made joint emperor with him, drew Aeneid 6, 869, which was taken to predict Quintillus' death 17 days after being made joint emperor

=== Medieval instances ===
In the medieval era Virgil was often thought to have magic powers or a gift of prophecy (perhaps influencing Dante's choice of Virgil as his guide in the Divine Comedy). Clyde Pharr, in the introduction to his edition of the Aeneid, notes that

In the mediaeval period a great circle of legends and stories of miracles gathered around [Vergil's] name, and the Vergil of history was transformed into the Vergil of magic. He was looked upon not only as a great magician but as an inspired pagan prophet who had foretold the birth of Christ. It was at this period that the spelling Virgil came into vogue, thus associating the great poet with the magic or prophetic wand, virga.

=== Renaissance instances ===
Rabelais also relates that he drew the more optimistic Aeneid 6, 857, which he took to mean himself.

Viscount Falkland once went to a public library in Oxford with King Charles I and, being shown a finely printed and bound copy of the Aeneid, suggested to the King that he use the Sortes Virgilanae to tell his future. The King opened the book but happened on Dido's prayer against Aeneas in Book 4.615, at which he was troubled. Nevertheless, Falkland took his own lots, hoping to pick a passage that did not relate to him and thus stop the King from worrying about his own. However, he picked the expressions of Evander upon the untimely death of his son Pallas in Book 11, which contemporaries later took to presage Falkland's death at the First Battle of Newbury in 1643 (with Charles's passage predicting his beheading in 1649).

== Sources ==
- This page draws text from 'The Mirror of Literature, Amusement, and Instruction', Vol. 10, Issue 273, September 15, 1827, a text now in the public domain.
- Gargantua and Pantagruel, Book 3, from "The Complete Works of François Rabelais", pp. 285–287
- Ziolkowski, Jan M.; Putnam, Michael C. J. (2008). The Virgilian Tradition: The First Fifteen Hundred Years. Yale University Press. ISBN 978-0300108224.
