= William Jurgens =

American Roman Catholic priest

William A. Jurgens
- Church: Roman Catholic
- Diocese: Roman Catholic Diocese of Cleveland

Orders
- Ordination: December 18, 1954

Personal details
- Born: July 3, 1928 Akron, Ohio, U.S.
- Died: September 1, 1982 (aged 54) Parma, Ohio, U.S.
- Buried: Holy Cross Cemetery, Brook Park, Ohio, U.S.

William A. Jurgens (July 3, 1928 — September 1, 1982) was an American Roman Catholic priest, composer, historian, musician, and translator of patristic and other works.

== Early life ==
He was born July 3, 1928, in Akron, Ohio, to Charles B. and Ruth C. (née Gardner) Jurgens. He had two brothers (Charles and James) and two sisters (Donna and Jeanne).

Jurgens attended Immaculate Conception Elementary School and then St. Vincent High School in Akron, where he was president of the National Honor Society. He graduated in 1946.

Jurgens then attended St. Joseph Minor Seminary in Westmont, Illinois, before completing his religious studies at St. Mary Seminary in Wickliffe, Ohio. A talented organist, he played the instrument at Our Lady of Victory Church in Tallmadge, Ohio, while attending seminary. He was ordained on December 18, 1954, at the Cathedral of St. John the Evangelist in Cleveland, Ohio, by Archbishop Edward F. Hoban.

At the time of his ordination, Macmillan published his translation of St. John Chrysostom's treatise On the Priesthood. (Note: The translation was published as The Priesthood: A Translation of the Peri Hierosynes of St. John Chrysostom.)

== Religious career ==
Jurgens was assigned as assistant pastor at St. Michael the Archangel Church in Cleveland at the end of 1954. Jurgens left Cleveland in 1956 and began studying sacred music at the Pontifical Institute of Sacred Music and ecclesiastical history at Gregorian University, both in Rome, Italy. He studied Gregorian chant at the Pontifical Institute, (Note: Sources are unclear if he earned a degree.) and earned a doctorate in ecclesiastical history from Gregorian.

Jurgens returned to Cleveland in April 1959, and was named assistant pastor at Blessed Sacrament Church on Fulton Road. Less than two months later, he was assigned to the faculty of St. Mary's Seminary where he was professor of patrology. He was given an additional assignment teaching at Borromeo Seminary in Wickliffe in 1961. He was appointed instructor of chant at both seminaries in 1965.

Jurgens was appointed Diocesan Director of Sacred Music in April 1961 after Rev. John H. Archibald of Holy Family Church in Stow, Ohio, resigned due to the press of duties in his parish. He served as director until 1968. Jurgens was also appointed to the Diocesan Liturgical Commission in August 1962, and was named the first chairman of the Diocesan Commission on Sacred Music in May 1964. (Note: Sources are unclear if or when he left either commission.)

Bishop Clarence Issenmann made Jurgens his secretary in 1974.

In 1977, Bishop James Hickey appointed Jurgens as Diocesan Research Historian, and tasked him with writing a detailed history of the diocese. The first volume in this work, A History of the Diocese of Cleveland: The Prehistory of the Diocese to Its Establishment in 1847, was published in 1980. Jurgens had written a draft of a second volume by 1982, but it was never finished. Jurgens fell ill with cancer in December 1981, and died from complications of cancer and diabetes at Holy Family Cancer Center in Parma, Ohio, on September 1, 1982.

Jurgens was buried in Holy Cross Cemetery (Brook Park, Ohio) in Brook Park, Ohio.

== Works ==
=== Theological and historical texts ===
Jurgens translated a number of theological and musical works during his lifetime, and wrote books about early church theologians as well as the liturgy. Among these are:

- Eustathius of Sebaste. Rome: Pontifical Gregorian University. 1958. OCLC 22409366.
- The Faith of the Early Fathers. Volume 1: Pre-Nicene and Nicene Eras. Collegeville, Minn.: Liturgical Press. 1970. ISBN 9780814604328.
- The Faith of the Early Fathers. Volume 2: Post-Nicene and Constantinopolitan Eras Through St. Jerome. Collegeville, Minn.: Liturgical Press. 1979. ISBN 9780814610077.
- The Faith of the Early Fathers. Volume 3: St. Augustine to the End of the Patristic Age. Collegeville, Minn.: Liturgical Press. 1979. ISBN 9780814610213.
- General Instruction on the Liturgy of the Hours. Collegeville, Minn.: Liturgical Press. 1975. ISBN 9780814608814.
- A History of the Diocese of Cleveland. Vol. 1: The Prehistory of the Diocese to Its Establishment in 1847. Cleveland: Catholic Diocese of Cleveland. 1980. OCLC 7485291.
- The Priesthood: A Translation of the Peri Hierosynes of St. John Chrysostom. New York: Macmillan. 1955. OCLC 634785579.
- Theological Dimensions of the Liturgy: A General Treatise on the Theology of the Liturgy. Collegeville, Minn.: Liturgical Press. 1976. ISBN 9780814609286. (co-authored with Cipriano Vagaggini and Leonard J. Doyle)

The three-volume Faith of the Early Fathers is now considered a standard patrological work. Catholic writer Karl Keating says it ranks with Joseph Tixeront's History of Dogmas and Johannes Quasten's Patrology as a fundamental collection of patrological works, the "premier work of its kind" and "prime reading for the apologist". Jurgens and Tixeront cover the same years, more so than Quasten. Jurgens' work is more inclusive and contains works from a greater variety of authors. Reviewing The Faith of the Early Fathers, scholar Herbert T. Mayer applauded the work's inclusiveness, the inclusion of canons and decrees, the length of excerpts (longer than in most works), Jurgens' doctrinal analysis, and the index (missing in many other works). He called it "a good history of the Christian church" suitable for seminaries.

=== Musical works ===
Jurgens was considered a composer and musician of some skill. He composed a number of musical works and published collections of existing works. These include:

- American Mass in Honor of the Venerable Kateri Tetakwitha. Boston: McLaughlin & Reilly. 1966. (lyrics and music by Jurgens)
- The Canticle of Mary. Glen Rock, N.J.: Fischer & Bro. 1968. (scripture set to music by Jurgens)
- Four Forms for a Common Penance Service: With Approved Liturgical Texts. Collegeville, Minn.: Liturgical Press. 1976. ISBN 9780814608722. (music by Jurgens)
- Gregorian Chant in Latin and in English. Toledo, Ohio: Gregorian Institute of America. 1965. OCLC 3654683. (collection)
- Hymns for Morning and Evening Devotions. Toledo, Ohio: Gregorian Institute of America. 1964. OCLC 1061710650. (traditional hymns fit to Gregorian chants by Jurgens; organ accompaniment composed by Eugène Lapierre)
- Kyriale Simplex: A Collection of Simple Chant Melodies for the Ordinary of the Mass 1965. Toledo, Ohio: Gregorian Institute of America. 1965. OCLC 37377696. (adaptation of the music of the then-newly approved Kyriale Simplex to the approved English text)
- Mass in Honor of Our Lady of the Lake. Toledo, Ohio: Gregorian Institute of America. 1967. (lyrics and music by Jurgens)
- Sung Vespers. Collegeville, Minn.: The Liturgical Press. 1968. OCLC 224154784. (the unabridged official text set to music by Jurgens)
