= Sortes Sanctorum =

Late antique text used for divination

Sortes Sanctorum (Note: "lots of the saints") (incipit Post solem surgunt stellae) (Note: "after the sun the stars come out") is a late antique text that was used for divination by means of dice. The oldest version of the text may have been pagan, but the earliest surviving example—a 4th- or 5th-century Greek fragment on papyrus—is Christian. The original version had 216 answers available depending on three ordered throws of a single die. It was later revised down to 56 answers for a single throw of three dice. This version was translated into Latin by the time of the council of Vannes (465), which condemned its use. The Latin version was subsequently revised to render it more acceptable to ecclesiastical authorities. This Latin version survives in numerous manuscripts from the early 9th century through the 16th, as well as in Old Occitan and Old French translations. Beginning in the 13th century, the text was sometimes known as the Sortes Apostolorum, (Note: "lots of the apostles") a title it shares with at least two other texts.

The term Sortes Sanctorum has a long history of being misunderstood and misapplied. It was once believed to be identical with the practice of sortes biblicae, whereby one would seek guidance by opening the Bible at random and consulting the verses therein. The mistaken identification seems to have originated with Edward Gibbon in the third volume of his Decline and Fall of the Roman Empire, published in 1781.

The title Sortes Sanctorum is a reference to Colossians 1:12.
