= List of populated places in Aksaray Province =

Below is the list of populated places in Aksaray Province, Turkey by the districts. In the following lists first place in each list is the administrative center of the district.

== Aksaray ==
- Aksaray
- Acıpınar, Aksaray
- Ağzıkarahan, Aksaray
- Akçakent, Aksaray
- Akhisar, Aksaray
- Akin, Aksaray
- Alayhanı, Aksaray
- Altınkaya, Aksaray
- Armutlu, Aksaray
- Ataköy, Aksaray
- Babakonağı, Aksaray
- Bağlı, Aksaray
- Bağlıkaya, Aksaray
- Bayındır, Aksaray
- Baymış, Aksaray
- Bebek, Aksaray
- Borucu, Aksaray
- Bostanlık, Aksaray
- Boyalı, Aksaray
- Bozcatepe, Aksaray
- Büyükgüve, Aksaray
- Büyükpörnekler, Aksaray
- Cankıllı, Aksaray
- Çağlayan, Aksaray
- Çavdarlılar, Aksaray
- Çekiçler, Aksaray
- Çeltek, Aksaray
- Çimeliyeni, Aksaray
- Çolaknebi, Aksaray
- Darıhüyük, Aksaray
- Dikmen, Aksaray
- Doğantarla, Aksaray
- Ekecikgödeler, Aksaray
- Ekeciktolu, Aksaray
- Ekecikyeni, Aksaray
- Elmacık, Aksaray
- Fatmauşağı, Aksaray
- Gençosman, Aksaray
- Gökçe, Aksaray
- Göksügüzel, Aksaray
- Gözlükuyu, Aksaray
- Gücünkaya, Aksaray
- Gültepe, Aksaray
- Hatipoğlutolu, Aksaray
- Helvadere, Aksaray
- Hırkato, Aksaray
- İncesu, Aksaray
- İsmailağatolu, Aksaray
- Kalebalta, Aksaray
- Karacaören, Aksaray
- Karaçayır, Aksaray
- Karakova, Aksaray
- Karakuyu, Aksaray
- Karaören, Aksaray
- Macarlı, Aksaray
- Nurgöz, Aksaray
- Sağırkaraca
- Sağlık, Aksaray
- Salmanlı, Aksaray
- Sapmaz, Aksaray
- Sarayhan, Aksaray
- Sarıağı, Aksarayl
- Seleciköse, Aksaray
- Sevinçli, Aksaray
- Sultanhanı, Aksaray
- Susadı, Aksaray
- Şeyhler, Aksaray
- Taptukemre, Aksaray
- Taşpınar, Aksaray
- Tatlıca, Aksaray
- Topakkaya, Aksaray
- Ulukışla, Aksaray
- Ulukışlatolu, Aksaray
- Yağan, Aksaray
- Yalman, Aksaray
- Yalnızceviz, Aksaray
- Yanyurt, Aksaray
- Yapılcan, Aksaray
- Yenikent, Aksaray
- Yenipınar, Aksaray
- Yeşilova, Aksaray
- Yeşiltepe, Aksaray
- Yeşiltömek, Aksaray
- Yuva, Aksaray

== Ağaçören ==
- Ağaçören
- Abalı, Ağaçören
- Abdiuşağı, Ağaçören
- Ahırlı, Ağaçören
- Avşar, Ağaçören
- Camili, Ağaçören
- Çatalçeşme, Ağaçören
- Dadılar, Ağaçören
- Demircili, Ağaçören
- Göllü, Ağaçören
- Göynük, Ağaçören
- Güzelöz, Ağaçören
- Hacıahmetlidavutlu, Ağaçören
- Hacıahmetlitepeköy, Ağaçören
- Hacıismailli, Ağaçören
- Hüsrevköy, Ağaçören
- Kaşıçalık, Ağaçören
- Kederli, Ağaçören
- Kılıçlı, Ağaçören
- Kırımini, Ağaçören
- Kurtini, Ağaçören
- Kütüklü, Ağaçören
- Oymaağaç, Ağaçören
- Sarıağıl, Ağaçören
- Sarıhasanlı
- Sofular, Ağaçören
- Yağmurhüyüğü, Ağaçören
- Yenice, Ağaçören
- Yenişabanlı, Ağaçören

== Eskil ==
- Eskil
- Başaran, Eskil
- Bayramdüğün, Eskil
- Büğet, Eskil
- Celil, Eskil
- Çukuryurt, Eskil
- Eşmekaya, Eskil
- Gümüşdüğün, Eskil
- Güneşli, Eskil
- Katrancı, Eskil
- Kökez, Eskil
- Sağsak, Eskil

== Gülağaç ==
- Gülağaç
- Akmezar, Gülağaç
- Bekarlar, Gülağaç
- Camiliören, Gülağaç
- Çatalsu, Gülağaç
- Cumhuriyet, Gülağaç
- Demirci, Gülağaç*Düğüz
- Gülpınar, Gülağaç
- Kızılkaya, Gülağaç
- Pınarbaşı, Gülağaç
- Saratlı, Gülağaç
- Sofular, Gülağaç
- Süleymanhüyüğü, Gülağaç

== Güzelyurt ==
- Güzelyurt
- Alanyurt, Güzelyurt
- Belisırma, Güzelyurt
- Bozcayurt, Güzelyurt
- Gaziemir, Güzelyurt
- Ihlara, Güzelyurt
- Ilısu, Güzelyurt
- Selime, Güzelyurt
- Sivrihisar, Güzelyurt
- Uzunkaya, Güzelyurt
- Yaprakhisar, Güzelyurt

== Ortaköy ==
- Ortaköy, Aksaray
- Akpınar, Ortaköy
- Balcı, Ortaköy
- Bozkır, Ortaköy
- Camuzluk, Ortaköy
- Ceceli, Ortaköy
- Cumali, Ortaköy
- Çatin, Ortaköy
- Devedamı, Ortaköy
- Durhasanlı, Ortaköy
- Gökkaya, Ortaköy
- Gökler, Ortaköy
- Hacıibrahimuşağı
- Hacımahmutuşağı
- Harmandalı, Ortaköy
- Hıdırlı, Ortaköy
- Hocabeyli, Ortaköy
- Karapınar, Ortaköy
- Kümbet, Ortaköy
- Namlıkışla, Ortaköy
- Oğuzlar, Ortaköy
- Ozancık, Ortaköy
- Pınarbaşı, Ortaköy
- Pirli, Ortaköy
- Reşadiye, Ortaköy
- Salarıalaca, Ortaköy
- Salarıgödeler, Ortaköy
- Sarıkaraman, Ortaköy
- Satansarı, Ortaköy
- Seksenuşağı, Ortaköy
- Yıldırımlar, Ortaköy

== Sarıyahşi ==
- Sarıyahşi
- Bekdik, Sarıyahşi
- Boğazköy, Sarıyahşi
- Demirciobası, Sarıyahşi
- Sipahiler, Sarıyahşi
- Yaylak, Sarıyahşi
- Yenitorunobası, Sarıyahşi
