= List of municipalities in Aksaray Province =

This is the List of municipalities in Aksaray Province, Turkey as of January 2023.

District	Municipality
Ağaçören	Ağaçören
Aksaray	Aksaray
Aksaray	Bağlıkaya
Aksaray	Helvadere
Aksaray	Sağlık
Aksaray	Taşpınar
Aksaray	Topakkaya
Aksaray	Yenikent
Aksaray	Yeşilova
Aksaray	Yeşiltepe
Eskil	Eskil
Eskil	Eşmekaya
Gülağaç	Demirci
Gülağaç	Gülağaç
Gülağaç	Gülpınar
Gülağaç	Saratlı
Güzelyurt	Güzelyurt
Güzelyurt	Ihlara
Güzelyurt	Selime
Ortaköy	Ortaköy
Sarıyahşi	Sarıyahşi
Sultanhanı	Sultanhanı
