= Tuz Gölü Fault Zone =

Seismic fault in Central Turkey

Tuz Gölü Fault Zone (TGFZ)
- Koçhisar-Aksaray Fault Zone
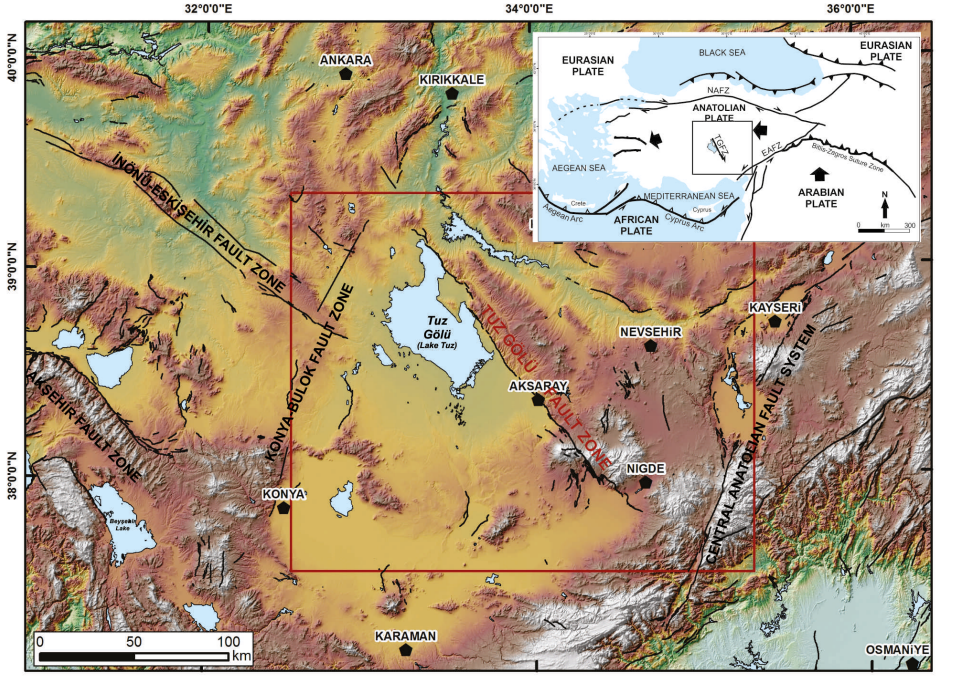
- The Tuz Gölü Fault Zone (inside the red square, black lines) on a topographic map of the region. Cities are marked with a pentagon.
- Etymology: Lake Tuz
- Country: Turkey
- Region: Central Anatolia region
- Cities: Aksaray, Niğde

Characteristics
- Length: ~200 km (120 mi)
- Width: 2–25 km (1.2–15.5 mi)

Tectonics
- Plate: Anatolian Plate
- Type: Dip-slip with smaller strike-slip component
- Age: Pliocene

The Tuz Gölü Fault Zone (TGFZ), also called the Koçhisar-Aksaray Fault, is a fault zone located in central Turkey in the Central Anatolia region. It is a roughly 200 km (120 mi) long fault that extends from near the northern tip of Lake Tuz, where the fault gets its name from to Kemerhisar. The fault is a northwest-southeast directed fault and is a normal fault which dips to the southwest; the fault is also 2–25 km (1.2–15.5 mi) wide. The TGFZ can be found in the neotectonic region of Central Anatolian "Ova" Province, where extensional tectonics takes place. The fault, combining with Mount Hasan, poses a notable hazard to the region. A large earthquake on the segment adjacent to Mt. Hasan could trigger a magma reservoir failure.

== Geologic setting ==
Turkey is a country host to one of the highest active deformation in the Eastern Mediterranean, owing to its special geologic setting. The formation of the landmass of Turkey is heavily associated with the nearby convergent boundaries interacting between the African, Eurasian and Arabian plates. These boundaries, the North Anatolian Fault (NAF), East Anatolian Fault (EAF), Dead Sea Transform (DST) and the Hellenic subduction zone (HSZ) control the neotectonics of Turkey. As the result of constant convergence between the plates, four different neotectonic regions were developed. These include the East Anatolian compression region, North Anatolian region, Western Anatolian extensional region and the Central Anatolia "Ova" province. The TGFZ belongs in the Central Anatolian province, where extensional basins like the Konya Basin surrounded by oblique-slip faults are referred to as "ova", hence the name to the region. The Central Anatolia province is a continuation of the Western Anatolian extension region with weaker extension; it is also a transition zone between the other neotectonic areas.

The TGFZ serves as a boundary between smaller neotectonic blocks. Some of these boundaries in the same province include the Central Anatolian Fault System, İnönü-Eskişehir Fault Zone and the Akşehir Fault Zone. TGFZ forms the boundary between the Kayseri-Sivas neotectonic region, with a transtensional character and the Konya-Eskişehir neotectonic region, with an extensional character.

== Fault characteristics ==
Over the years, there has been limited consensus regarding the characteristics of the Tuz Gölü Fault Zone. It has been argued that the fault is either dominantly strike-slip or dominantly normal. Slip rates vary per segment.

The fault is 2–25 km (1.2–15.5 mi) wide and extends over 200 km, starting near Lake Tuz and terminating near Kemerhisar. The fault extends in a northwest-southeast direction and dips towards the southwest.

=== Fault segmentation ===
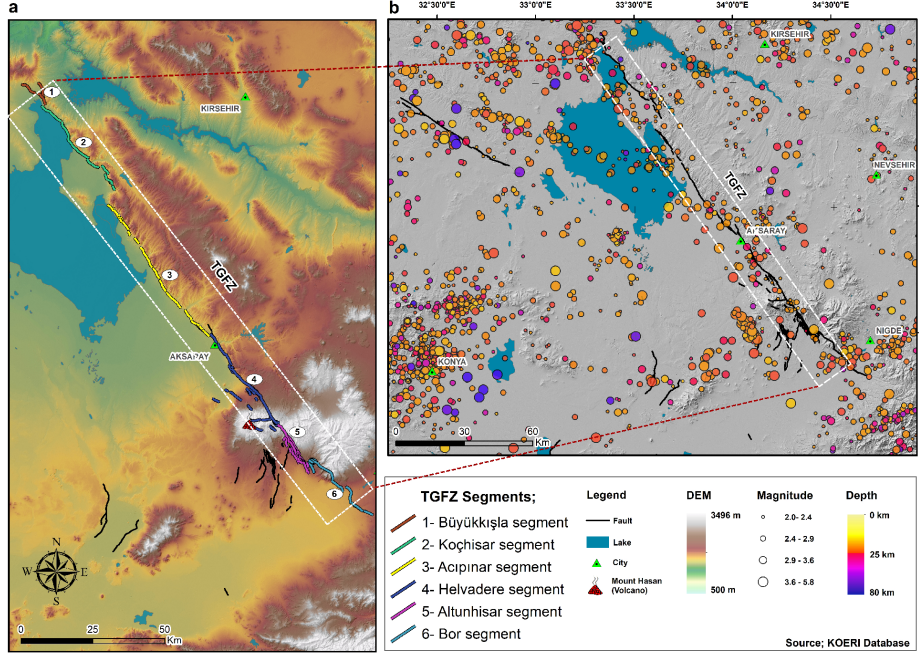
The segments of the TGFZ, numbered and shown on a map. Right side of the graphic features a map of the faults nearby and instrumental seismicity.

The Tuz Gölü Fault Zone can be dissected to 6 different segments using geometric modeling. These segments are, from north to south; the Büyükkışla, Koçhisar, Acıpınar, Helvadere, Altunhisar and Bor segments.

Using GNSS, in the Büyükkışla, Koçhisar and Acıpınar segments, the dip-slip rates were measured 1.1 mm (0.043 in)/yr and the strike-slip rates were found 1.6 mm (0.063 in)/yr. The same rates for the Helvadere segment were measured as 2.1 mm (0.083 in)/yr and 1.8 mm (0.071 in)/yr, and for the Altunhisar/Bor segments they were measured as 2.5 mm (0.098 in)/yr and 2.2 mm (0.087 in)/yr. Additionally, restored lava flows on the Helvadere segment yielded between 0.90–1.23 mm (0.035–0.048 in)/yr vertical displacement rates, along with much smaller strike-slip rates. According to stream gradient anomalies, the central (Helvadere) segment likely represents a higher seismic risk compared to the northern and southern segments.

== Future threat ==
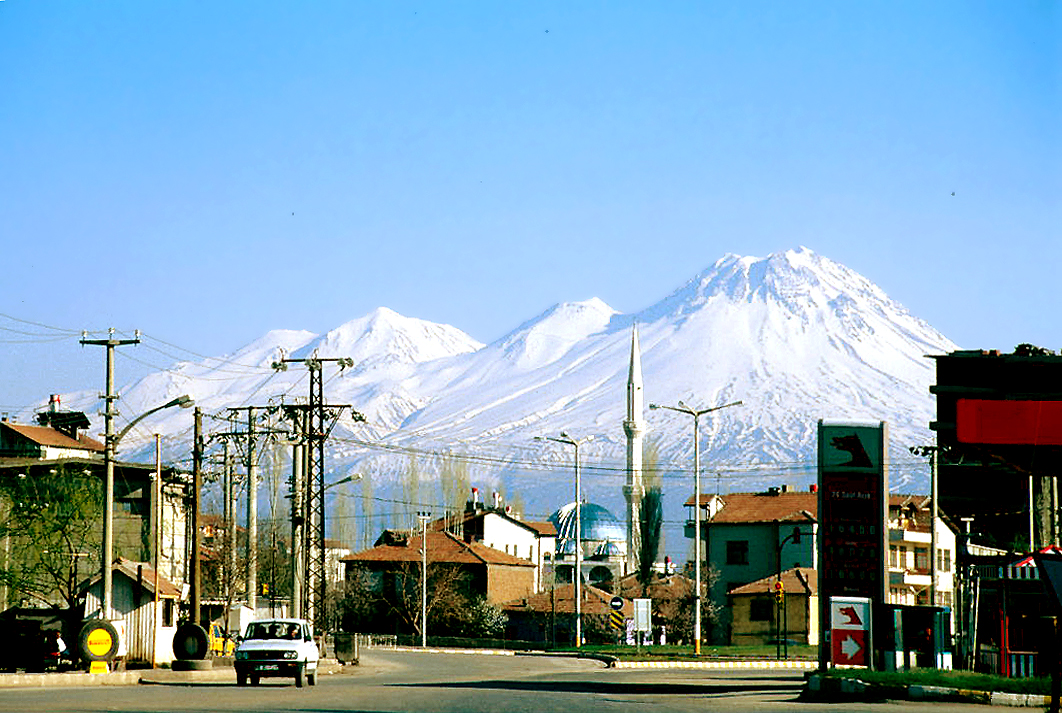
The Tuz Gölü Fault Zone poses a significant threat for Mount Hasan to erupt.

The TGFZ cuts across the Mount Hasan volcanic complex; Quaternary products of the volcano has also been cut through by the fault. This presents a risk where, in the case of a large earthquake, the stress generated by the fault rupture could trigger magma chamber failure of the adjacent volcano. Ever since the segment last had a large earthquake, 5.5 kya (thousand years ago), stress build-up has been sufficient to push the fault to another rupture. An earthquake of M_{w} 5.8-6.8 could unclamp the way for new magma pathways. Despite the current situation of Mt. Hasan's magma chamber not being known, the presence of fumaroles and seismic anomalies within the crust is enough to prove the existence of magma feeder systems beneath the volcano. Overall, the seismic and volcanic risks pose significant threats to the region. Additionally, the gradual slip of the fault alone pushes the magma reservoir closer to failure.

== See also ==
- North Anatolian Fault
- East Anatolian Fault
- Mount Hasan
