= Sarıyahşi District =

District of Aksaray Province, Turkey

- District
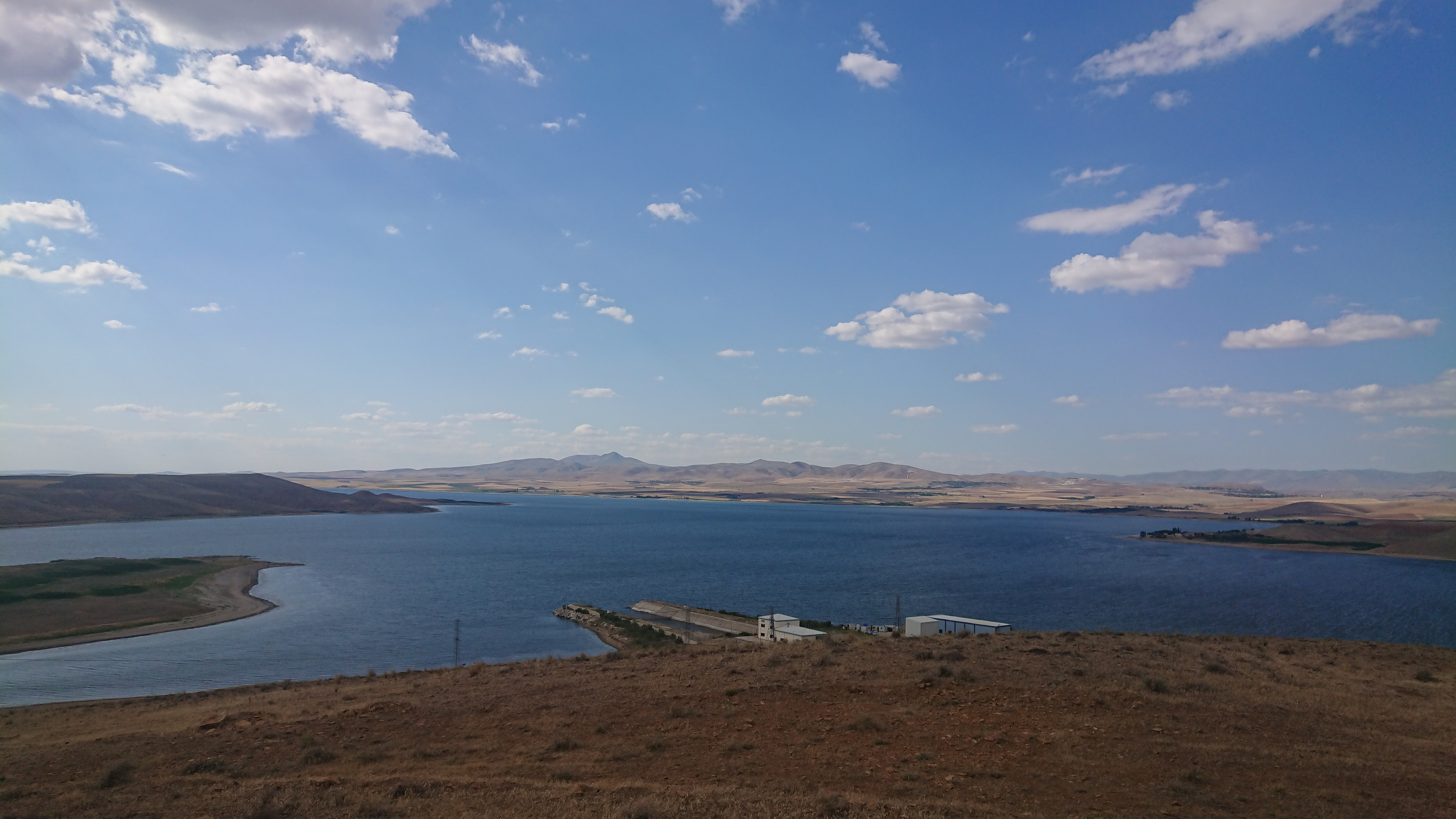
- Reservoir of Hirfanlı Dam in Sarıyahşı

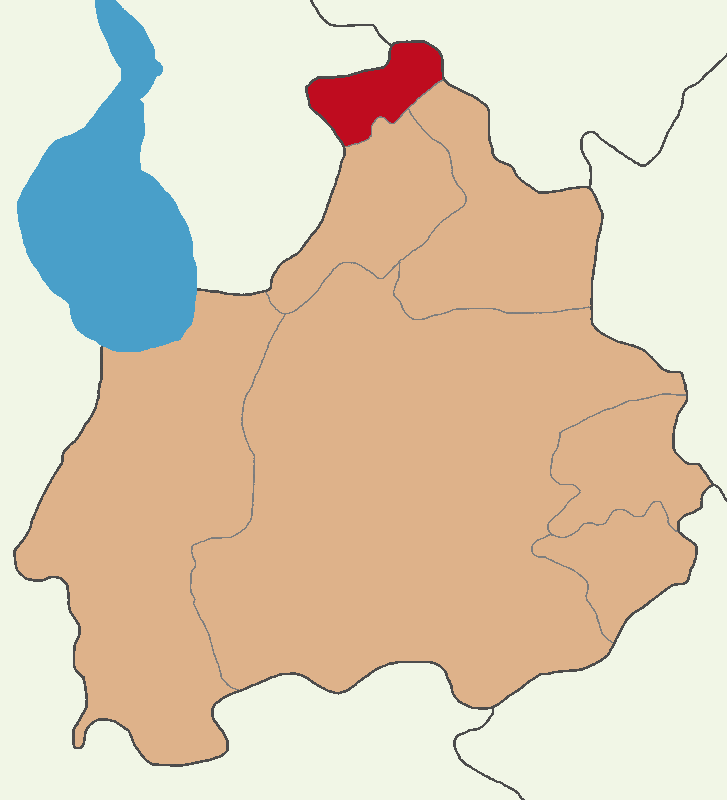
- Map showing Sarıyahşi District in Aksaray Province

- Location within Turkey Location within Turkey Central Anatolia
- Coordinates: 38°59′N 33°51′E
- Country: Turkey
- Province: Aksaray
- Seat: Sarıyahşi

Government
  - Kaymakam: Oğuzhan Akman
- Area: 210 km^{2} (81 sq mi)
- Population (2025): 4,717
  - Density: 22/km^{2} (58/sq mi)
- Time zone: UTC+3 (TRT)
- Website: www.sariyahsi.gov.tr

Sarıyahşi District is a district of Aksaray Province of Turkey. Spread over an area of 210 km^{2} (81 sq mi), it had a population of 4,717 in 2025. It is the smallest district by area and population in the province. The district consists of the municipality of Sarıyahşi and six villages.

== History ==
The earliest settlers were from the settlement of Rumkuş, which is now part of Kırşehir Province, who established the Sarıyahşi village.

According to History of Sereflikoçhisar with its Monuments and Epigraphs by İbrahim Hakkı Konyalı, the origin of the name Sarıyahşi is associated with Yahşi Han, a Turkish soldier who reportedly died from his injuries while passing through the settlement with his soldiers. The settlement, previously known as "Sarı", meaning "beautiful", came to be known as Sarıyahşi, the combination of the words Sarı and Yahşi.

Sarıyahşi became a town in 1957 and was part of Şereflikoçhisar district of Ankara Province. It was established as a new district in the Aksaray Province as per Law No. 3587 on 15 June 1989.

== Geography ==
Sarıyahşı District is a district of Aksaray Province, located in the Central Anatolia region of Turkey. It is located in the northern part of the Aksaray Province, bordering the provinces of Ankara and Kırşehir. It is spread over an area of 210 km^{2} (81 sq mi), and is the smallest district by area in the province. It is located at an average altitude of 1,092 m (3,583 ft). along the reservoir of the Hirfanlı Dam.

The district consists of the municipality of Sarıyahşi, and six villages–Bekdik, Boğazköy, Demirciobası, Sipahiler, Yaylak, and Yenitorunobası.

== Demographics and economy ==
According to 2025 population statistics published by the Turkish Statistical Institute, Sarıyahşi District had a population of 4,717 inhabitants, including 2,380 males and 2,337 females. It was the least populous district in Aksaray Province, accounting for approximately 1.1% of the provincial population. Its population declined by approximately 10.1% between 2020 and 2025.

The district had approximately 9,252.5 hectares (22,863 acres) of agricultural land in 2025. Wheat, barley, chickpeas, sugar beet and vegetables are the major crops. Animal husbandry including sheep rearing and fishing along the Hirfanlı reservoir are other economic activities in the district.
