= Sapmaz =

Sapmaz may refer to:

- Sapmaz, Aksaray, village in Aksaray Province, Turkey
- Sapmaz, Kürtün, village in Gümüşhane Province, Turkey
