= Karakuyu =

Karakuyu means "black well" in Turkic languages and may refer to:

- Karakuyu, Aksaray, village in Aksaray Province, Turkey
- Karakuyu, Dinar, village in Afyonkarahisar Province, Turkey
- Karakuyu, Emirdağ, village in Afyonkarahisar Province, Turkey
- Karakuyu, Karaisalı, village in Adana Province, Turkey
- Karakuyu, Korkuteli, village in Antalya Province, Turkey
- Karakuyu, Polatlı, village in Ankara Province, Turkey
- Karakuyu, Saimbeyli, village in Adana Province, Turkey
- Karakuyu, Seyhan, village in Adana Province, Turkey
