= Altınkaya =

Altınkaya (literally "golden rock" or "golden boulder") is a Turkish place name that may refer to:

== People ==
- Sibel Altınkaya (born 1993), Turkish female table tennis player

== Places ==
- Altınkaya, Aksaray, a village in the district of Aksaray, Aksaray Province
- Altınkaya, Manavgat, a village in the district of Manavgat, Antalya Province
- Altınkaya, Tercan
- Altınkaya, Vezirköprü, a village in the district of Vezirköprü, Samsun Province
- Altınkaya Dam
