= Yenipınar =

Yenipınar (Turkish: "new springs") may refer to the following places in Turkey:

- Yenipınar, Aksaray, a village in the district of Aksaray, Aksaray Province
- Yenipınar, Beşiri, a village in the district of Beşiri, Batman Province
