= Ağzıkara Han =

Caravanserai in Turkey

Coordinates: 38°26′43.3″N 34°08′26.6″E

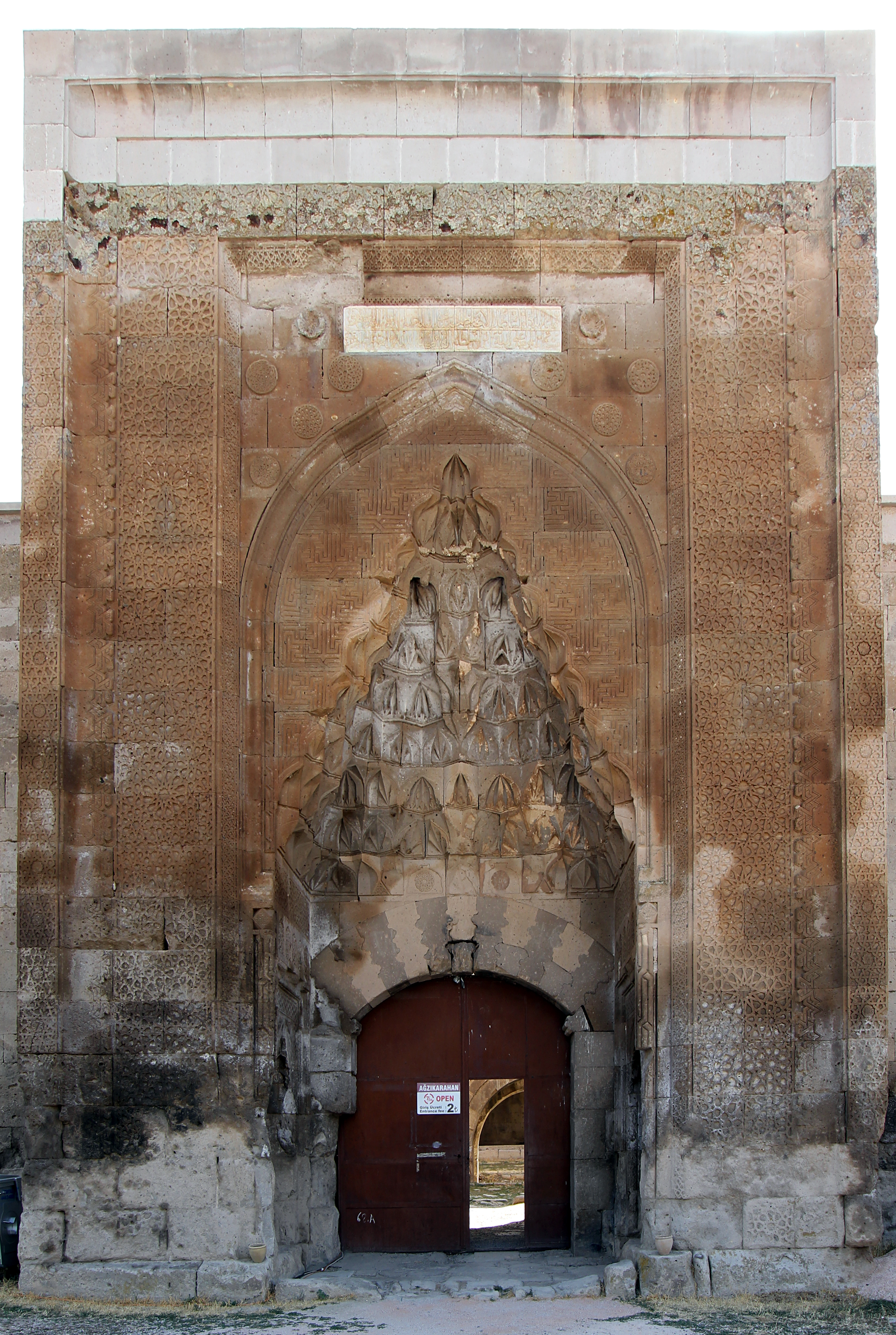
The main entrance portal of the caravanserai

Ağzıkara Han is a historic Seljuk-era caravanserai in Turkey. It is located in the Ağzıkarahan village in the province of Aksaray.

== History ==
The caravanserai is considered one of the most important and richly decorated examples of ordinary caravanserais built by non-royal patrons. Foundation inscriptions attest that the covered/roofed section of the building was completed in June 1231 during the reign of Sultan Ala ad-Din Kayqubad I, while the courtyard was completed in February 1240 during the reign of his successor Kaykhusraw II. The patron who commissioned the construction was named Mes’ud, son of Abdullah.

== Architecture ==
Like other major caravanserais of this period, it consists of two sections: one centered around a main courtyard, and an indoors section. The caravanserai is entered via a monumental entrance portal (pishtaq) projecting from the plain exterior walls of the building, with stone-carved decoration and a vaulted canopy of muqarnas. It leads to the main courtyard, around which are numerous chambers. In the middle of the courtyard is a small mosque consisting of a square stone chamber raised on four pillars and reached by stairs, considered an excellent example of this feature (which recurs in other caravanserais). The indoors section consists of a vaulted nave with a central dome (though the dome itself has been lost), from which vaulted chambers open on either side.

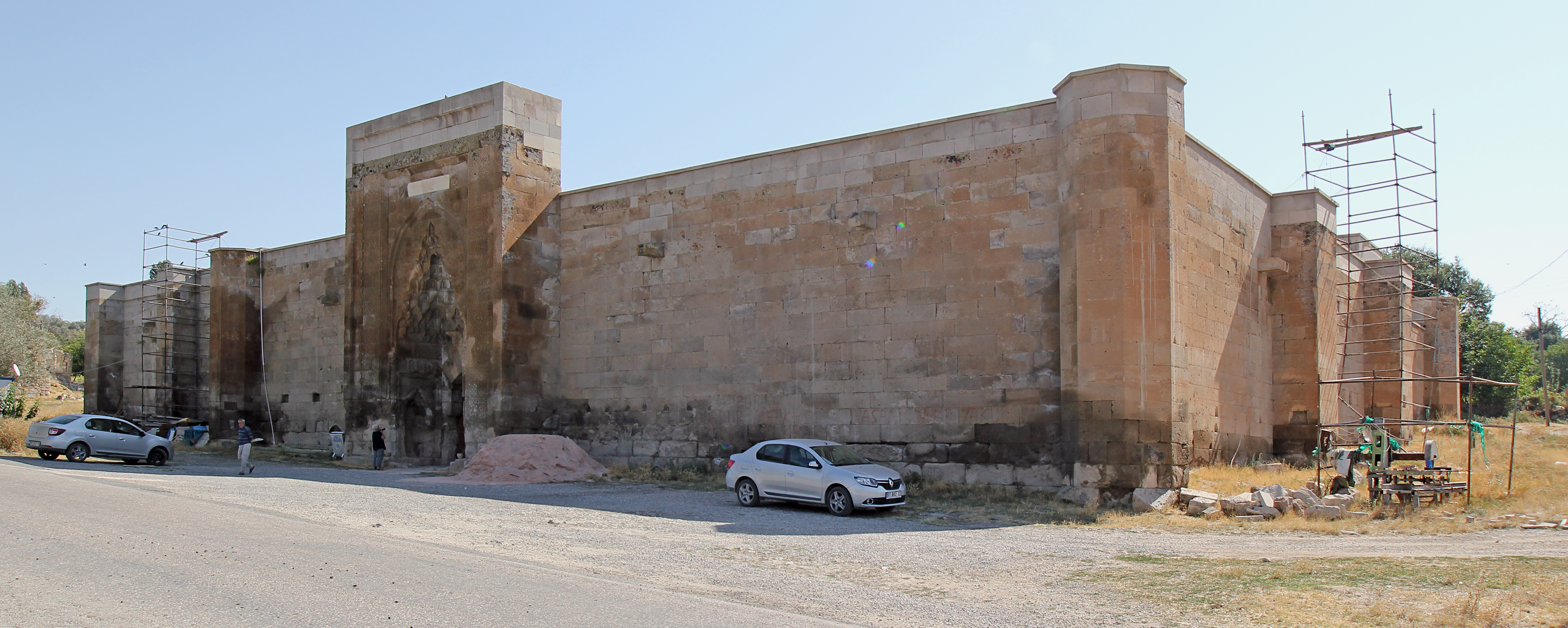
General view of the exterior

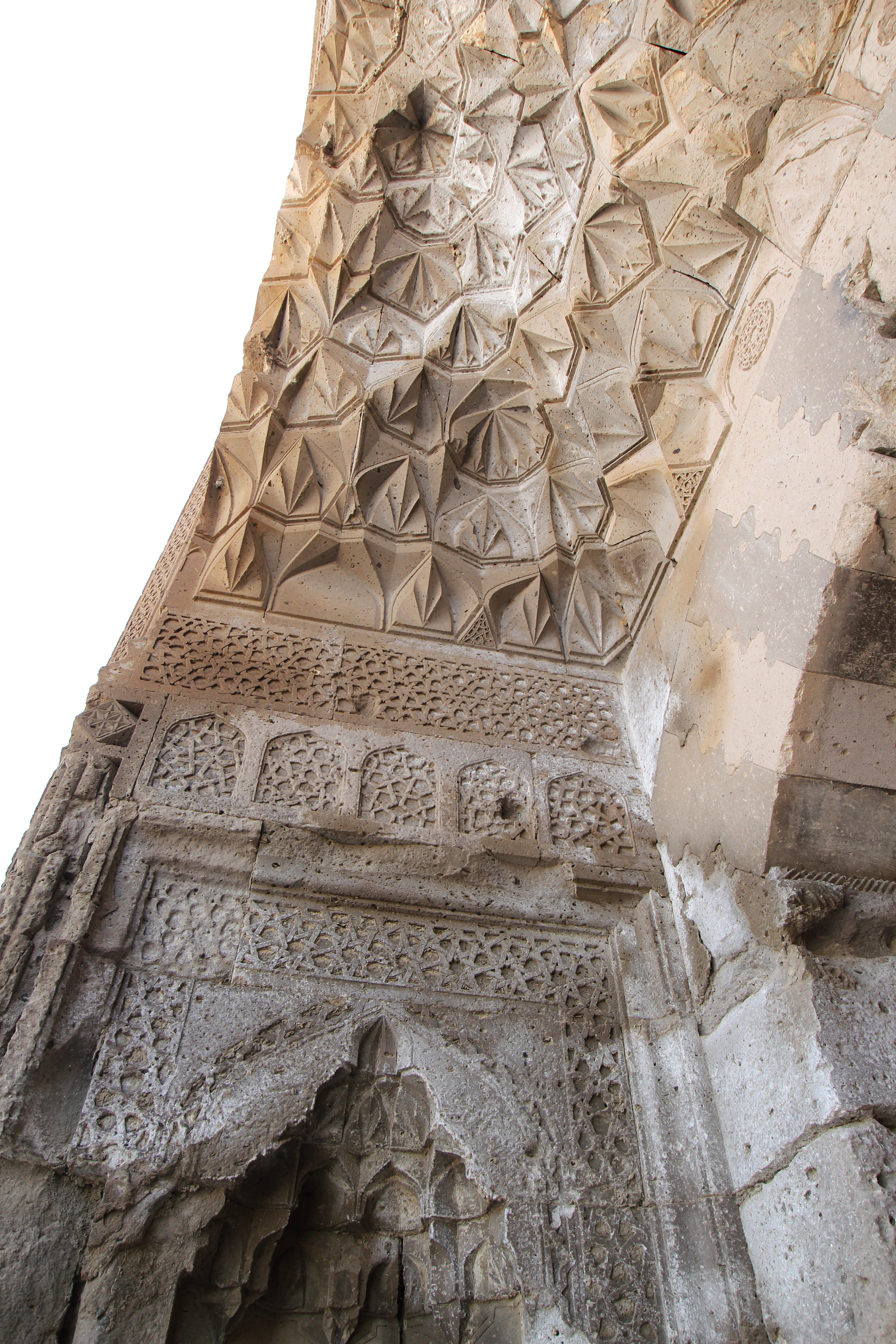
Details of the stone carving in the main entrance portal

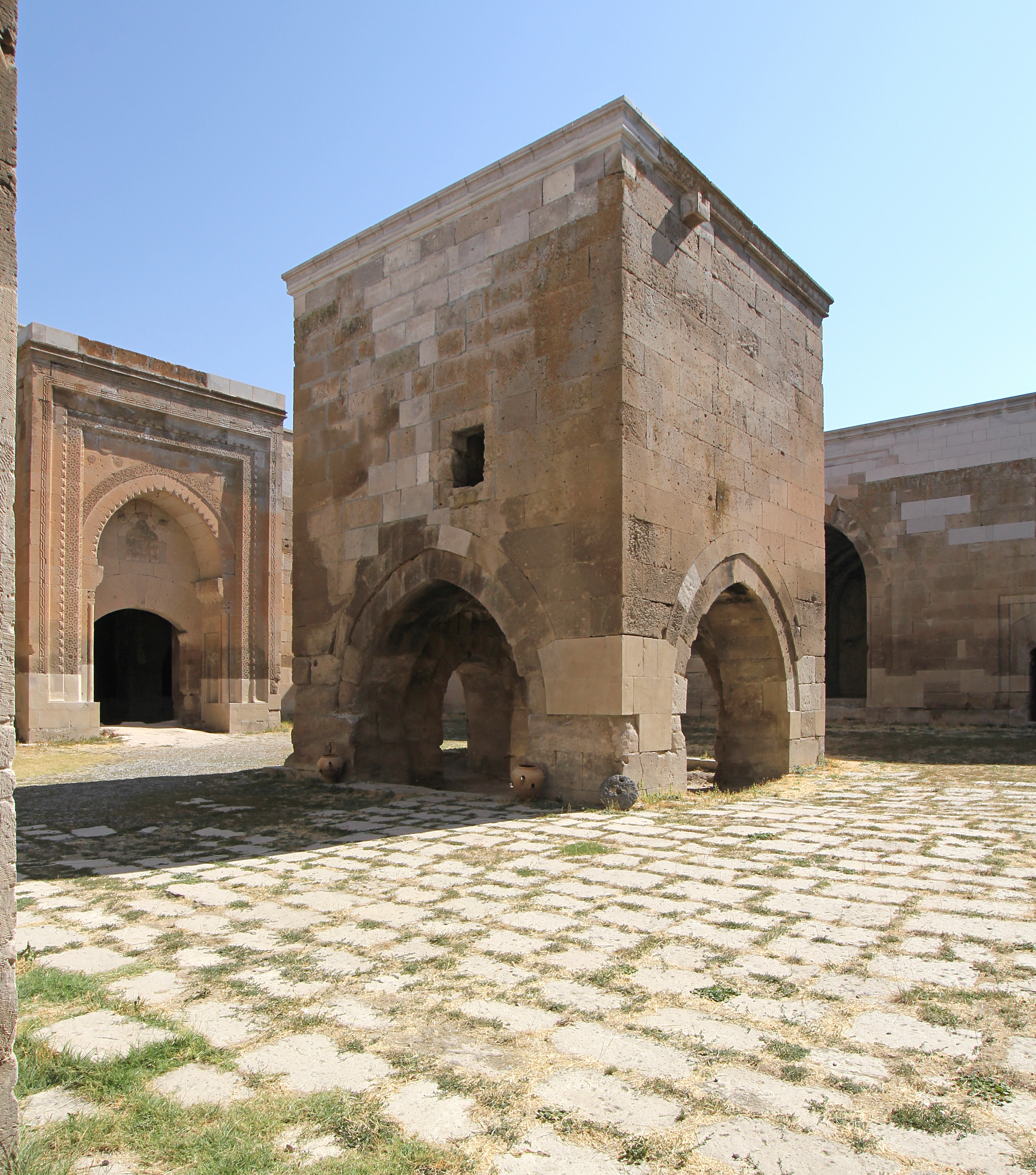
The main courtyard with the elevated mosque

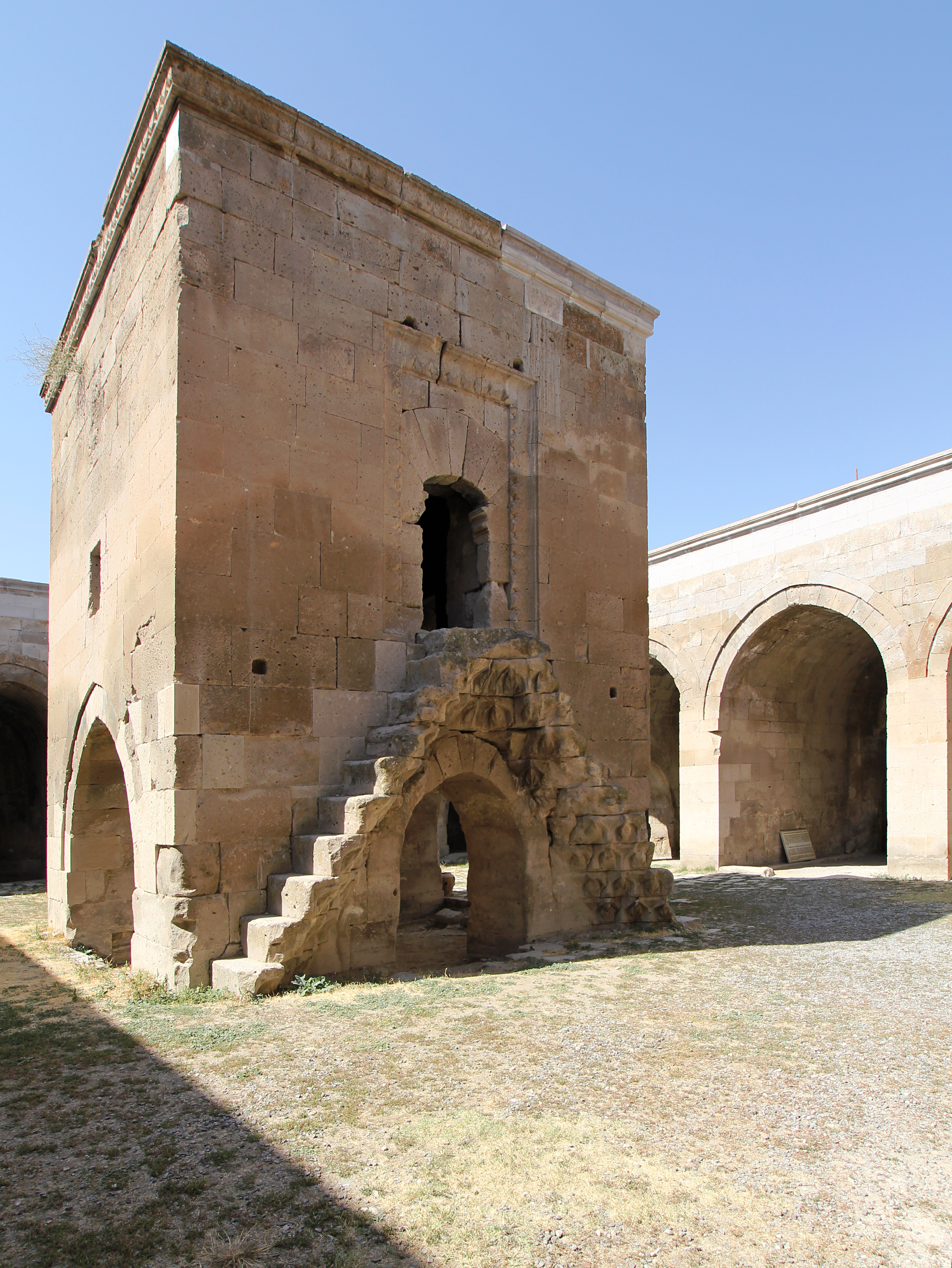
The mosque, seen from its entrance side

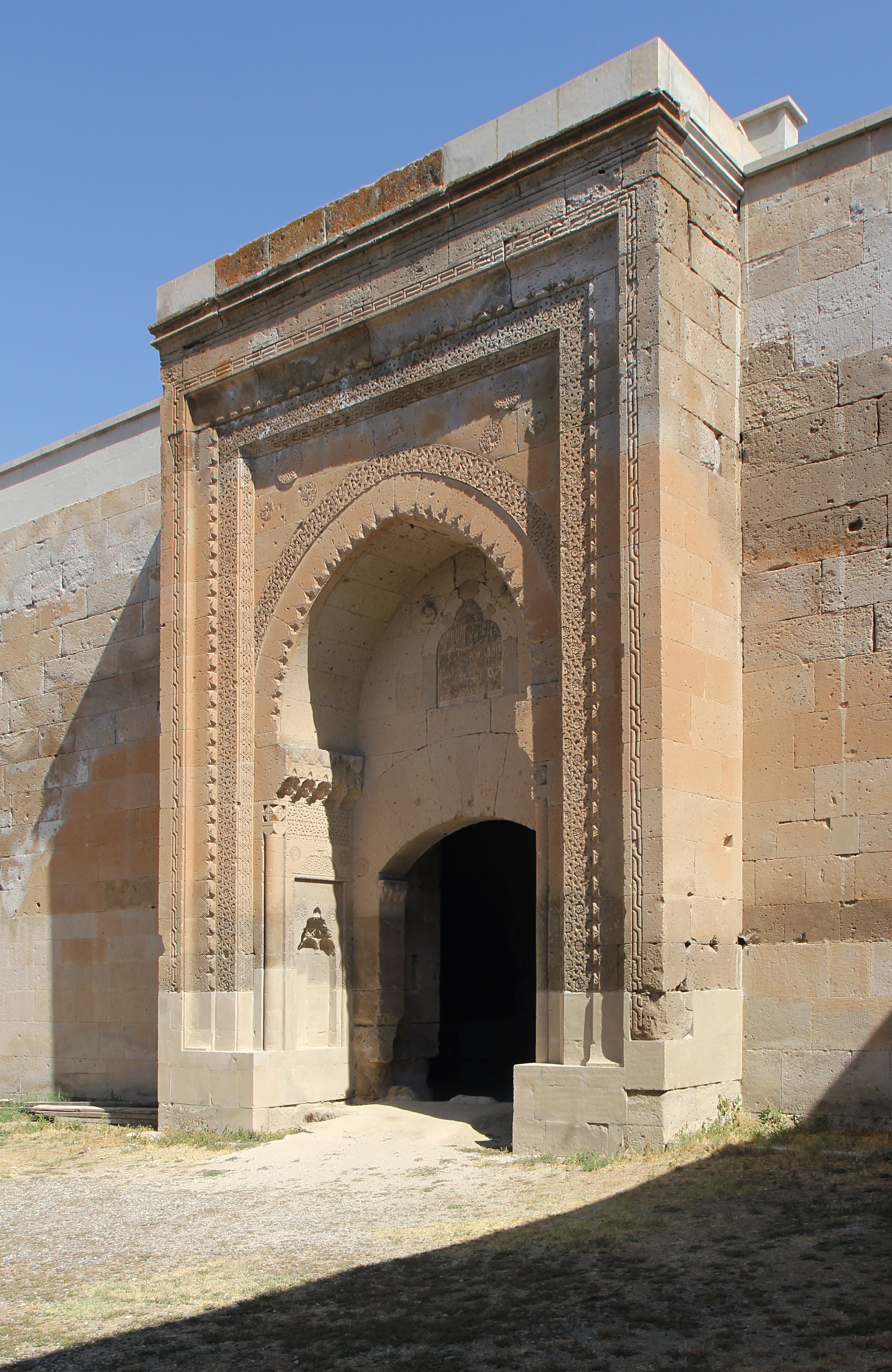
The entrance portal of the covered or indoors section

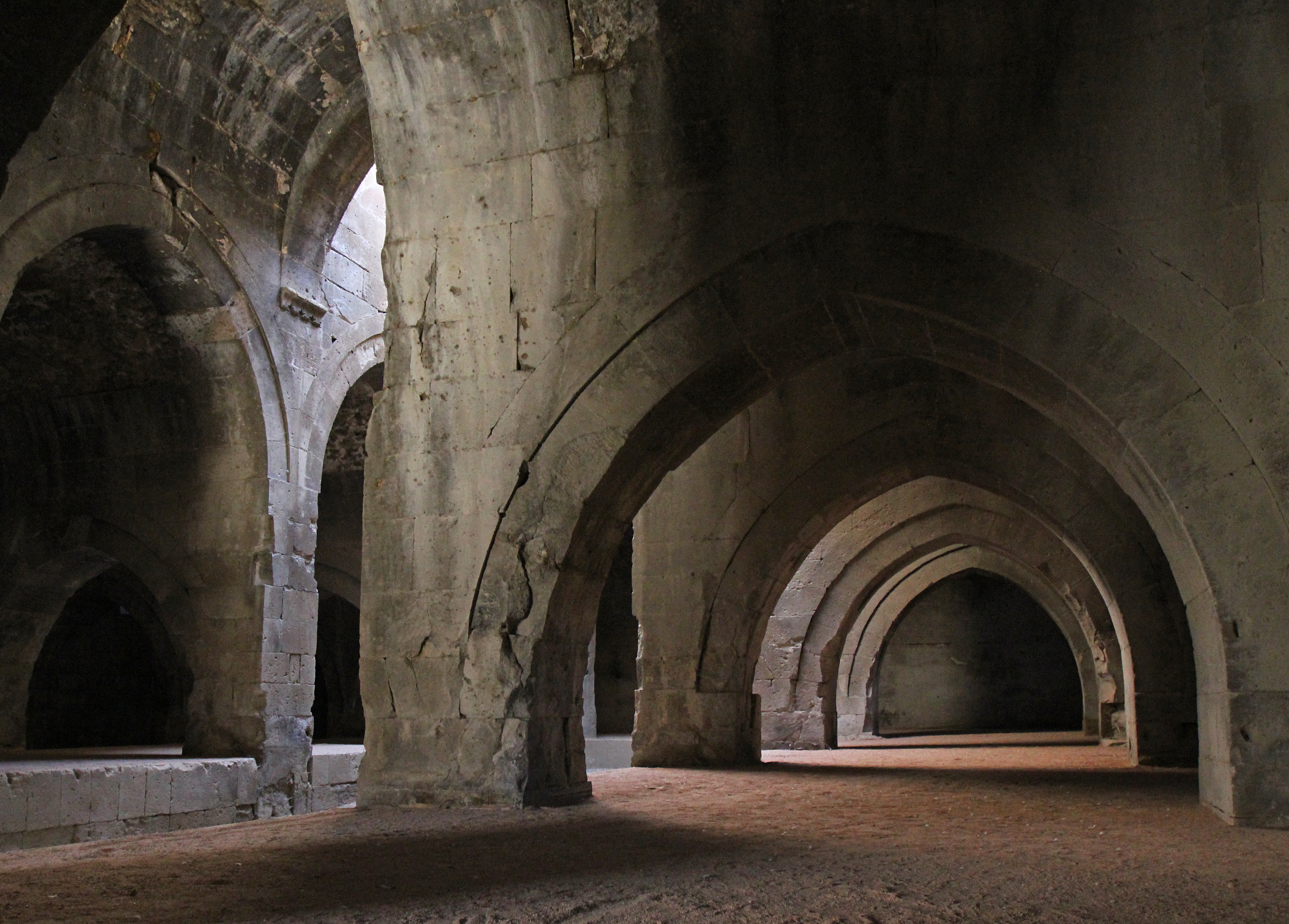
The interior of the covered section

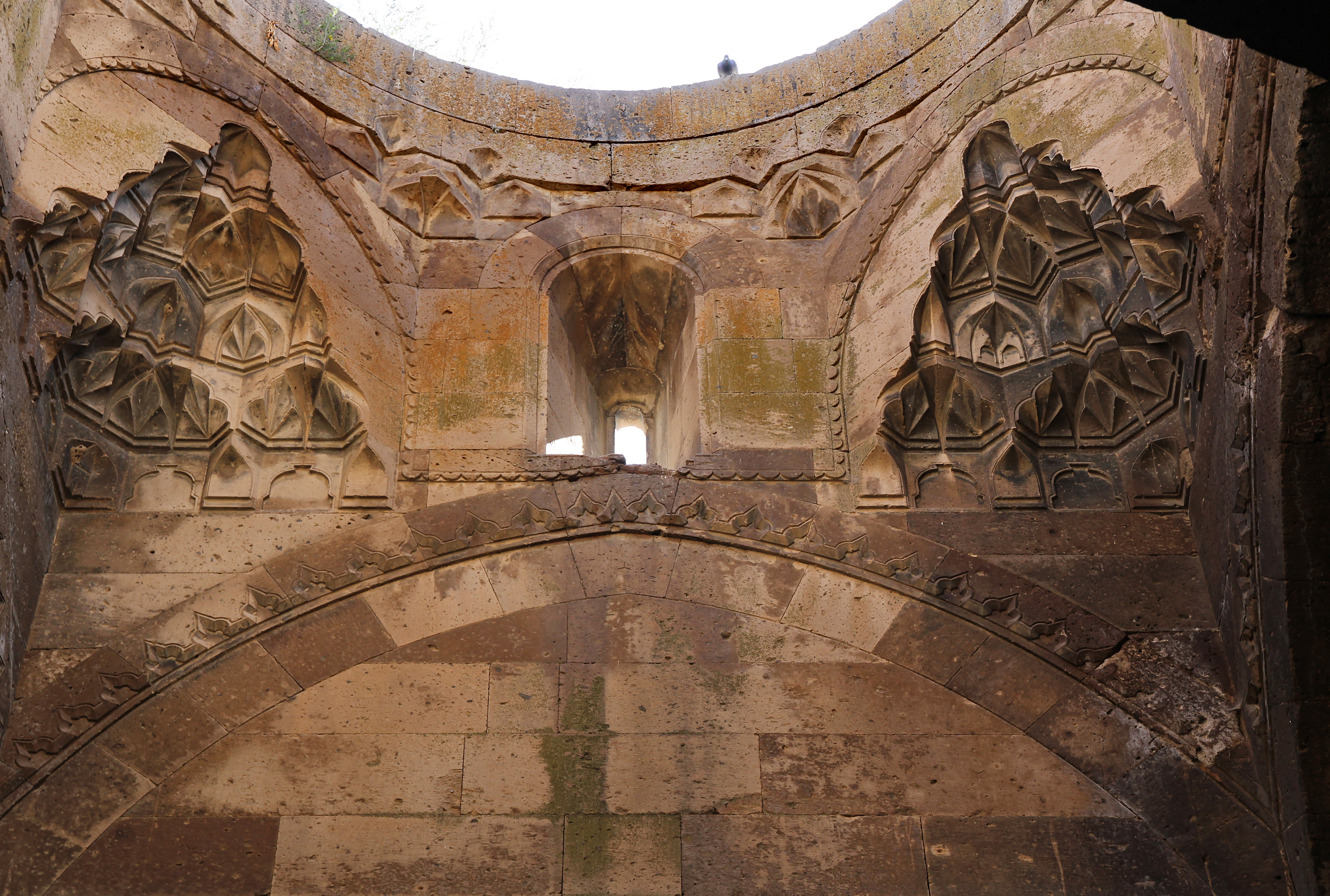
The base and muqarnas-carved squinches of the central dome in the covered section (the dome itself has been lost)
