= Şeyhler =

Şeyhler (literally "sheikhs" in Turkish) may refer to the following places in Turkey:

- Şeyhler, Aksaray, a village in the district of Aksaray, Aksaray Province
- Şeyhler, Akyurt, a neighborhood of the district of Akyurt, Ankara Province
- Şeyhler, Göynücek, a village in the district of Göynücek, Amasya Province
- Şeyhler, Kurucaşile, a village in the district of Kurucaşile, Bartın Province
