= Boyalı =

Boyalı may refer to:

== Surname ==
- Ayşegül Ergin Boyalı (born 1971), Turkish female Taekwondo practitioner
- Ekrem Boyalı (born 1970), Turkish Taekwondo practitioner and coach

== Places ==
- Boyalı, Aksaray, village in Aksaray Province, Turkey
- Boyalı, Ardanuç, village in Artvin Province, Turkey
- Boyalı, Beypazarı, village in Ankara Province, Turkey
- Boyalı, Güdül, village in Ankara Province, Turkey
- Boyalı, Sinanpaşa, village in Afyonkarahisar Province, Turkey
- Boyalı, Suluova, village in Amasya Province, Turkey
- Boyalı, Yusufeli, village in Artvin Province, Turkey

== See also ==
- Boyali, a town in Central African Republic
- Boali, a town in Central African Republic
