= Gökçe, Aksaray =

Gökçe
- Village
- Location within Turkey Location within Turkey Central Anatolia
- Coordinates: 38.4169°N 34.1737°E
- Country: Turkey
- Province: Aksaray
- District: Aksaray
- Population (2021): 509
- Time zone: UTC+3 (TRT)

Gökçe is a village in the Aksaray District, Aksaray Province, Turkey. Its population is 509 (2021).

== Places of interest ==
- Mamasın Dam
- St. Mamas Church
- St. Michel Church (Aziz Michel Kilisesi)
