= Gençosman =

Ottoman military soldier (1621–1638)

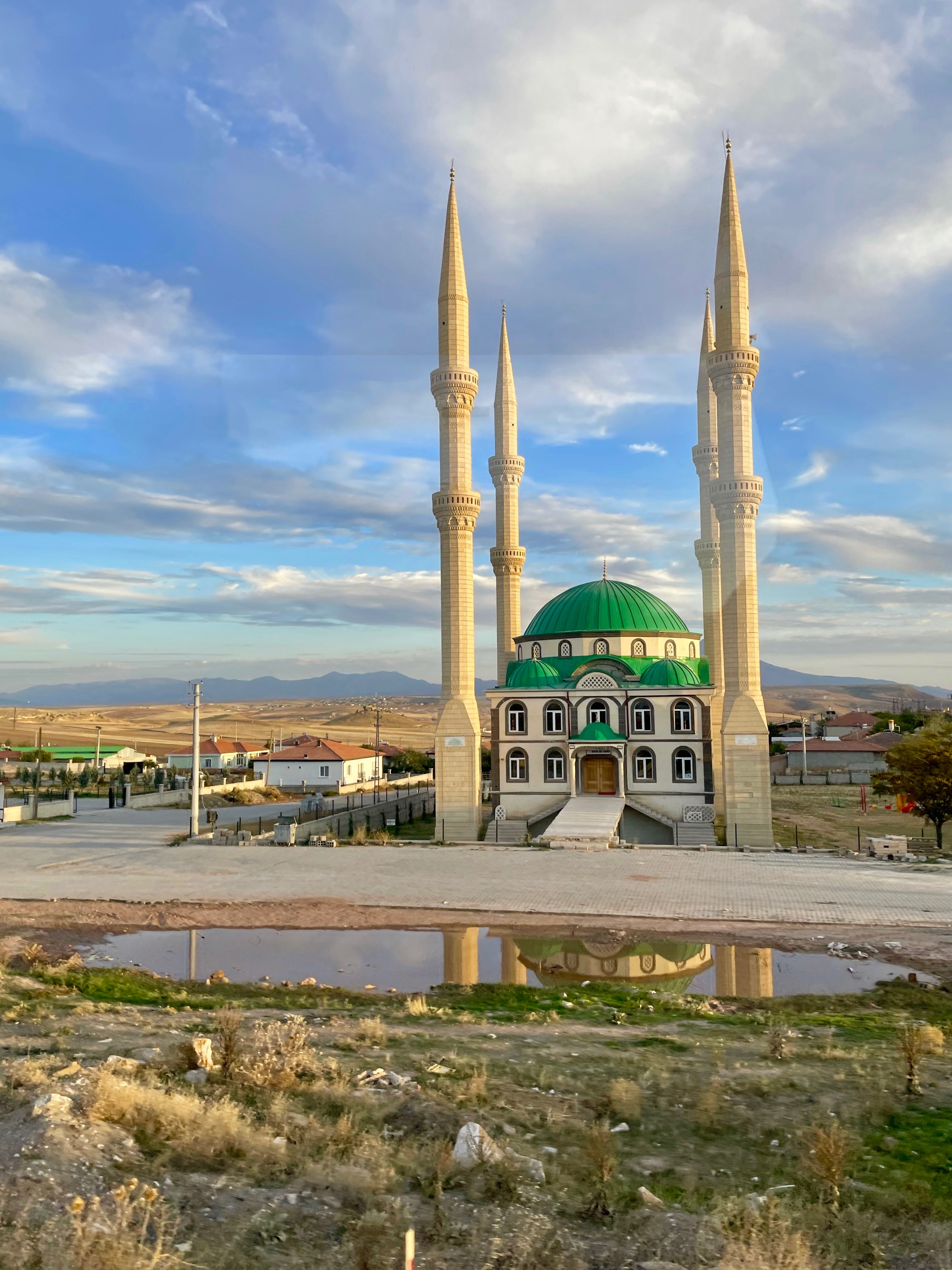
Mosque in Gençosman, Aksaray, Gençosman's hometown and now named after him

Gençosman (1621–1638) was a person from the Ottoman Empire who distinguished himself during the Capture of Baghdad (1638).

He was born in 1621. Although he was too young to join the army during Murad IV's campaign, he secretly joined the army and was the first soldier to plant the Ottoman flag to the bastion of the fort. But soon he fell.

== Burial and legacy ==
His remains were buried in his home village, Dorikini (modern-day Gençosman). In the 1960s, the name of the village was changed to Gençosman to commemorate him.
