= Aksaray District =

District of Aksaray Province, Turkey

- District
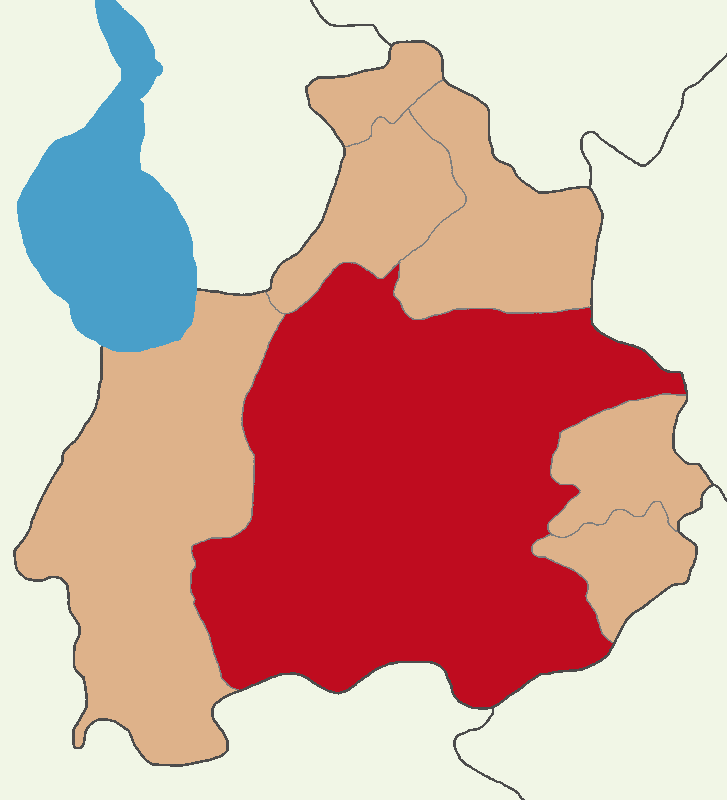
- Map showing Aksaray District in Aksaray Province

- Location within Turkey Location within Turkey Central Anatolia
- Coordinates: 38°22′N 34°02′E
- Country: Turkey
- Province: Aksaray
- Seat: Aksaray
- Area: 3,540 km^{2} (1,370 sq mi)
- Population (2025): 327,575
  - Density: 92.5/km^{2} (240/sq mi)
- Time zone: UTC+3 (TRT)

Aksaray District, also known as Aksaray Merkez or simply Merkez, is a district of Aksaray Province, Turkey. Spread over an area of 3,540 km^{2} (1,370 sq mi), it had a population of 327,525 in 2025. It is the largest district by both area and population in the province. The district consists of nine municipalities, including the city of Aksaray, and 83 villages.

== History ==
Archaeological evidence of human occupation in the region around Aksaray date back to the Neolithic period. It is mentioned by the name of Nenessa in Hittite texts. It was known as Garsaura later before being renamed Archelais in honour of King Archelaus of Cappadocia. The city subsequently came under the Byzantine rule, during which, it was known as Taxara. It was part of the Silk Road. It was captured by the Seljuk Sultanate of Rum in 12th century CE, and Sultan Kilij Arslan II named it as Dar-üs-Zafer. During the Seljuk time, the region became to be mentioned as Aksaray. It subsequently came under the rule of Ilkhanate, Danishmends, and Karamanids, before the Ottoman Empire captured it around 1470. There are several historical buildings and monuments including the Eğri Minaret, built in the 13th century, and the Ulu Mosque, constructed in the early 15th century. Aksaray was part of the Konya Province till 1920, and became part of the newly formed Aksaray Province in 1920.

== Geography ==
Aksaray Merkez is a district of Aksaray Province, located in the Central Anatolia region of central Türkiye. It is spread over an area of 3,540 km^{2} (1,370 sq mi), and is the largest district by area in the province. Of the total land area, 1,943.24 km^{2} (750.29 sq mi) was classified as agricultural land in 2025.

=== Administrative divisions ===
The district consists of nine municipalities–Aksaray, Bağlıkaya, Helvadere, Sağlık, Taşpınar, Topakkaya, Yenikent, Yeşilova, and Yeşiltepe, and 83 villages.

- Acıpınar
- Ağzıkarahan
- Akçakent
- Akhisar
- Akin
- Alayhanı
- Altınkaya
- Armutlu
- Ataköy
- Babakonağı
- Bağlı
- Bayındır
- Baymış
- Bebek
- Borucu
- Bostanlık
- Boyalı
- Bozcatepe
- Büyükgüve
- Büyükpörnekler
- Çağlayan
- Cankıllı
- Çavdarlılar
- Çekiçler
- Çeltek
- Ceran
- Cerit
- Çimeliyeni
- Çolaknebi
- Darıhüyük
- Dikmen
- Doğantarla
- Ekecikgödeler
- Ekeciktol
- Ekecikyeni
- Elmacık
- Fatmauşağı
- Gençosman
- Gökçe
- Göksügüzel
- Gözlükuyu
- Gücünkaya
- Gültepe
- Hanobası
- Hatipoğlutolu
- Hırkatolu
- İncesu
- İsmailağatolu
- Kalebalta
- Karacaören
- Karaçayır
- Karakova
- Karakuyu
- Karaören
- Karataş
- Karkın
- Kazıcık
- Koçpınar
- Koyak
- Kutlu
- Küçükgüve
- Küçükpörnekler
- Macarlı
- Nurgöz
- Salmanlı
- Sapmaz
- Sarayhan
- Sarıağıl
- Seleciköse
- Sevinçli
- Şeyhler
- Susadı
- Taptukemre
- Tatlıca
- Ulukışla
- Ulukışlatolu
- Yağan
- Yalman
- Yalnızceviz
- Yanyurt
- Yapılcan
- Yenipınar
- Yuva

== Demographics and economy ==
According to 2025 population statistics published by the Turkish Statistical Institute, Aksaray Merkez had a population of 7,480 inhabitants, including 3,701 females and 3,779 males. It is the most populated district in the province, accounting for approximately 74.3% of the provincial population.

Aksaray is a major economic hub and did exports worth US$113.3 million in 2018. The Aksaray Organized Industrial Zone, spread over 298 acres (121 ha) and located on the Aksaray–Adana highway, accommodates 219 companies.
