= İncesu, Aksaray =

İncesu
- Village
- Location within Turkey Location within Turkey Central Anatolia
- Coordinates: 38°9′53″N 33°48′12″E
- Country: Turkey
- Province: Aksaray
- District: Aksaray
- Population (2021): 1,654
- Time zone: UTC+3 (TRT)

İncesu is a village in the Aksaray District, Aksaray Province, Turkey. Its population is 1,654 (2021). Before the 2013 reorganisation, it was a town (belde).
