= Bebek, Aksaray =

Bebek
- Village
- Location within Turkey Location within Turkey Central Anatolia
- Coordinates: 38.5030°N 34.2096°E
- Country: Turkey
- Province: Aksaray
- District: Aksaray
- Population (2021): 446
- Time zone: UTC+3 (TRT)

Bebek is a village in the Aksaray District, Aksaray Province, Turkey Its population is 446 (2021).
