= Baymış, Aksaray =

Baymış
- Village
- Location within Turkey Location within Turkey Central Anatolia
- Coordinates: 38°30′N 33°53′E
- Country: Turkey
- Province: Aksaray
- District: Aksaray
- Population (2021): 295
- Time zone: UTC+3 (TRT)

Baymış is a village in the Aksaray District, Aksaray Province, Turkey. Its population is 295 (2021).
