= Büyükgüve, Aksaray =

Büyükgüve
- Village
- Location within Turkey Location within Turkey Central Anatolia
- Coordinates: 38°40′N 33°51′E
- Country: Turkey
- Province: Aksaray
- District: Aksaray
- Population (2021): 55
- Time zone: UTC+3 (TRT)

Büyükgüve is a village in the Aksaray District, Aksaray Province, Turkey. Its population is 55 (2021).
