= Yenitorunobası, Sarıyahşi =

Yenitorunobası
- Village
- Location within Turkey Location within Turkey Central Anatolia
- Coordinates: 38°58′N 33°45′E
- Country: Turkey
- Province: Aksaray
- District: Sarıyahşi
- Population (2021): 62
- Time zone: UTC+3 (TRT)

Yenitorunobası is a village in the Sarıyahşi District, Aksaray Province, Turkey. Its population is 62 (2021).
