= Gençosman, Aksaray =

Gençosman
- Village
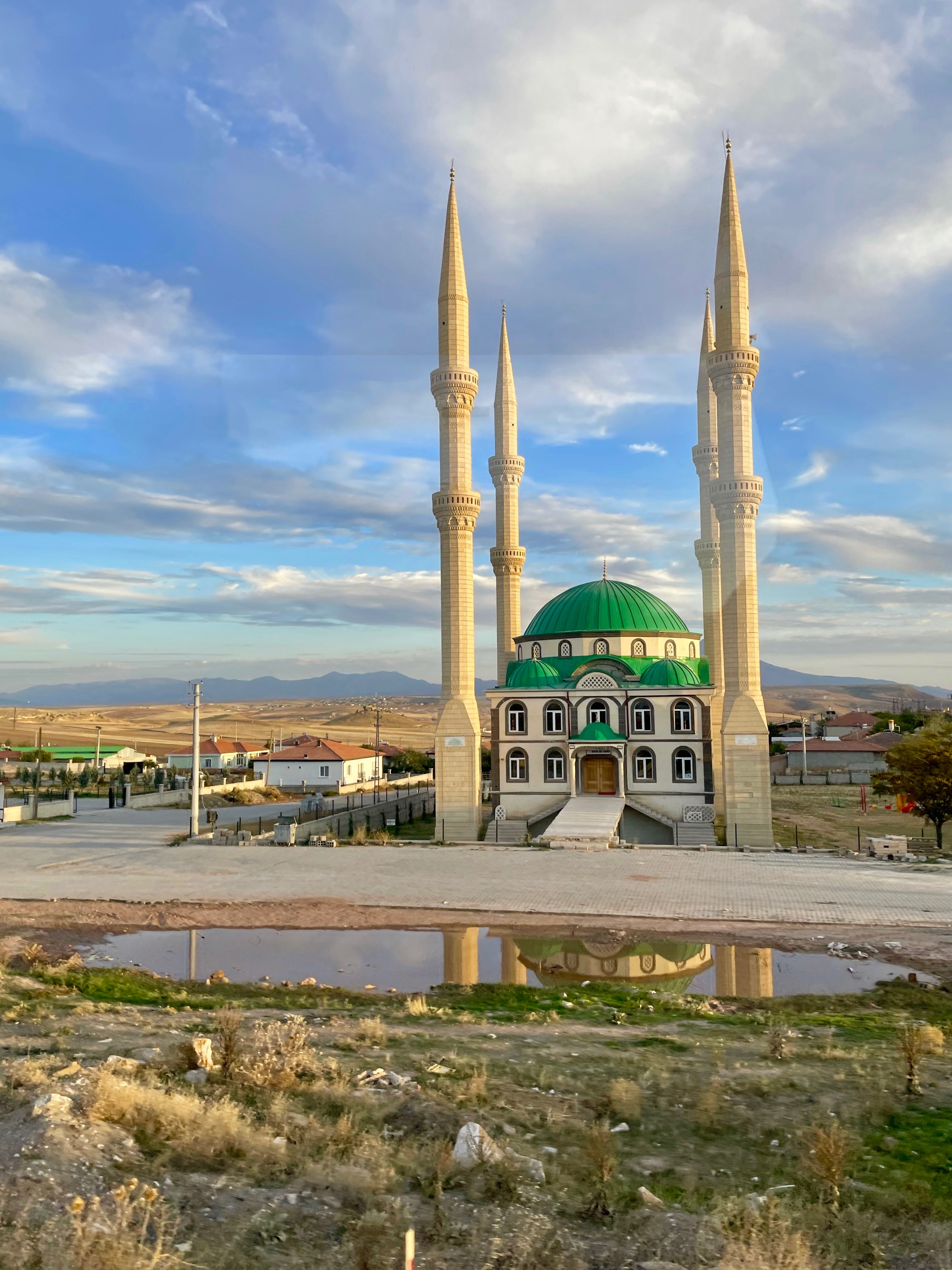
- Ayfer Arı Cami, Gençosman, Aksaray

- Location within Turkey Location within Turkey Central Anatolia
- Coordinates: 38°25′N 34°04′E
- Country: Turkey
- Province: Aksaray
- District: Aksaray
- Population (2021): 896
- Time zone: UTC+3 (TRT)

Gençosman is a village in the Aksaray District, Aksaray Province, Turkey. Its population is 896 (2021). Aksaray city centre is only 6 kilometres (3.7 mi) to the south. Altitude of the village is 1,150 metres (3,770 ft).The village was named after Turkish hero Gençosman.
