= Babakonağı, Aksaray =

Babakonağı
- Village
- Location within Turkey Location within Turkey Central Anatolia
- Coordinates: 38°36′15″N 34°15′57″E
- Country: Turkey
- Province: Aksaray
- District: Aksaray
- Population (2021): 237
- Time zone: UTC+3 (TRT)

Babakonağı (formerly: Gelesin) is a village in the Aksaray District, Aksaray Province, Turkey. Its population is 237 (2021). The village is populated by Kurds.
