= Ekecikyeni, Aksaray =

Ekecikyeni
- Village
- Location within Turkey Location within Turkey Central Anatolia
- Coordinates: 38.527°N 34.123°E
- Country: Turkey
- Province: Aksaray
- District: Aksaray
- Population (2021): 300
- Time zone: UTC+3 (TRT)

Ekecikyeni is a village in the Aksaray District, Aksaray Province, Turkey. Its population is 300 (2021). The village is populated by Kurds.
