= Yağan, Aksaray =

Yağan
- Village
- Location within Turkey Location within Turkey Central Anatolia
- Coordinates: 38°32′10″N 34°2′23″E
- Country: Turkey
- Province: Aksaray
- District: Aksaray
- Population (2021): 263
- Time zone: UTC+3 (TRT)

Yağan is a village in the Aksaray District, Aksaray Province, Turkey. Its population is 263 (2021).
