= Bekdik, Sarıyahşi =

Bekdik
- Village
- Location within Turkey Location within Turkey Central Anatolia
- Coordinates: 39°01′N 33°57′E
- Country: Turkey
- Province: Aksaray
- District: Sarıyahşi
- Population (2021): 288
- Time zone: UTC+3 (TRT)

Bekdik is a village in the Sarıyahşi District, Aksaray Province, Turkey. Its population is 288 (2021).
