= Dikmen, Aksaray =

Dikmen
- Village
- Location within Turkey Location within Turkey Central Anatolia
- Country: Turkey
- Province: Aksaray
- District: Aksaray
- Population (2021): 656
- Time zone: UTC+3 (TRT)

Dikmen, formerly known as Tokariz is a village in the Aksaray District, Aksaray Province, Turkey. Its population is 656 (2021).
