= Mamasın Dam =

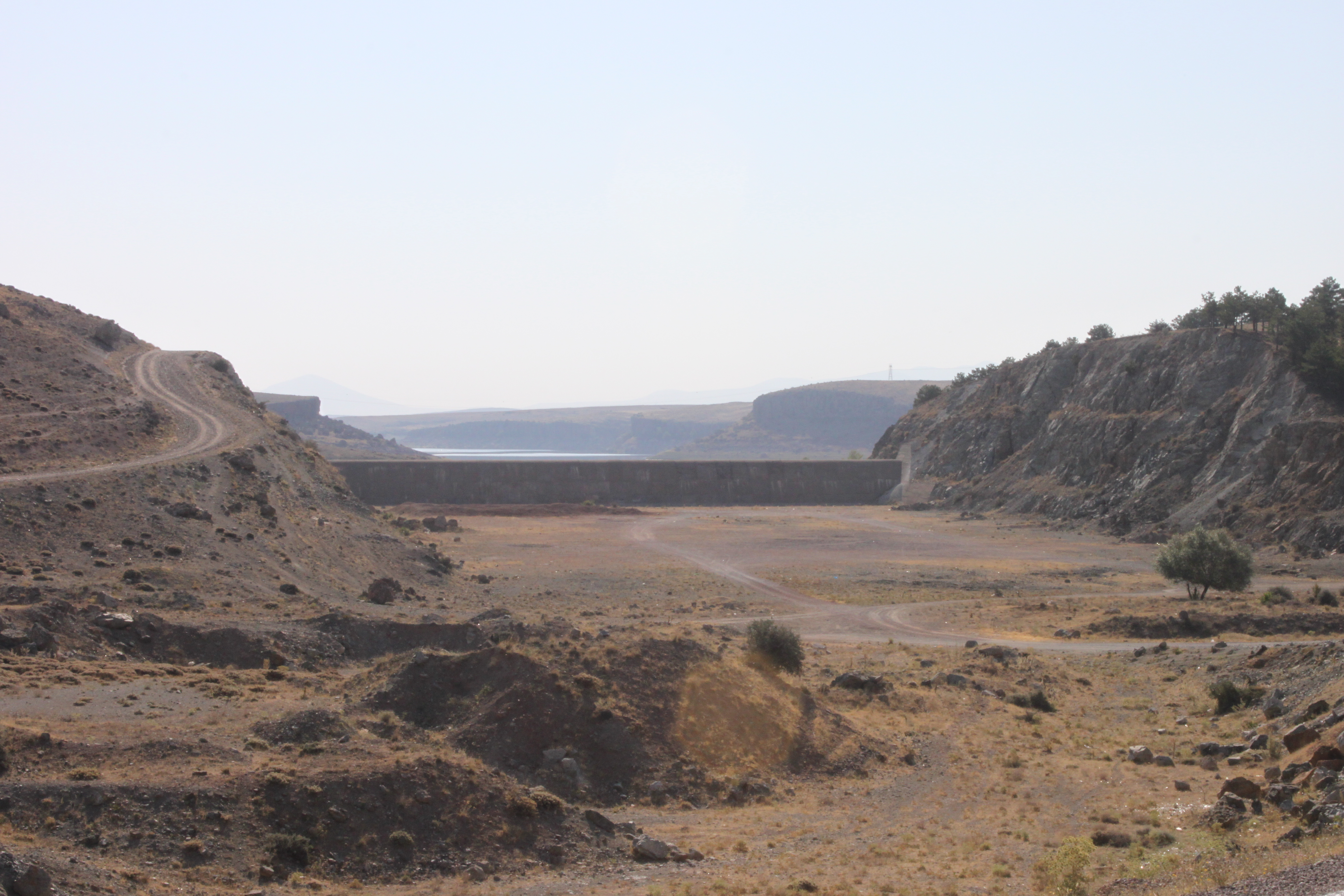
- Gücünkaya, Mamasın Dam
- Location: Gücüncaya, Aksaray Province, Turkey
- Coordinates: 38.4023°N 34.1319°E
- Construction began: 1957
- Opening date: 1962
- Construction cost: 14.477.000 old Turkish Lira
- Operator(s): State Hydraulic Works (DSİ)

Dam and spillways
- Height: 44.9 m

Reservoir
- Catchment area: 82,15 Mio. m³ to 165,8m³
- Surface area: 9.95 km² to 16.2 km²

Mamasın Dam is a dam in Turkey. The development was backed by the Turkish State Hydraulic Works.

== See also ==
- List of dams and reservoirs in Turkey
