= Alayhanı, Aksaray =

Alayhanı
- Village
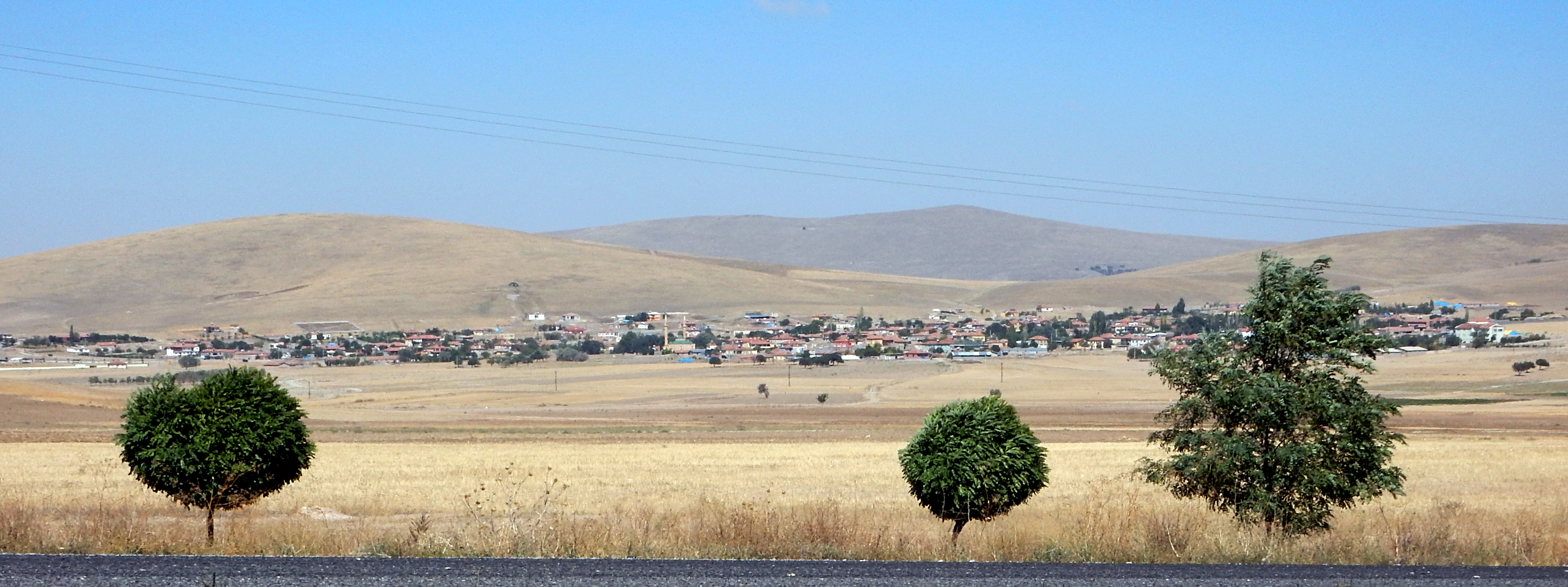
- Alayhanı

- Location within Turkey Location within Turkey Central Anatolia
- Coordinates: 38°32′N 34°20′E
- Country: Turkey
- Province: Aksaray
- District: Aksaray
- Population (2021): 520
- Time zone: UTC+3 (TRT)

Alayhanı is a village in the Aksaray District, Aksaray Province, Turkey. Its population is 520 (2021). The village is populated by Kurds.
