= Taptukemre, Aksaray =

Taptukemre
- Village
- Country: Turkey
- Province: Aksaray
- District: Aksaray
- Population (2021): 187
- Time zone: UTC+3 (TRT)

Taptukemre is a village in the Aksaray District, Aksaray Province, Turkey. Its population is 187 (2021). The village is populated by Kurds.
