= Ekeciktol, Aksaray =

Ekeciktol
- Village
- Location within Turkey Location within Turkey Central Anatolia
- Coordinates: 38.505°N 34.097°E
- Country: Turkey
- Province: Aksaray
- District: Aksaray
- Population (2021): 81
- Time zone: UTC+3 (TRT)

Ekeciktol is a village in the Aksaray District, Aksaray Province, Turkey. Its population is 81 (2021). The village is populated by Kurds.
