= Nurgöz, Aksaray =

Nurgöz
- Village
- Location within Turkey Location within Turkey Central Anatolia
- Coordinates: 38°34′N 34°00′E
- Country: Turkey
- Province: Aksaray
- District: Aksaray
- Population (2021): 457
- Time zone: UTC+3 (TRT)

Nurgöz is a village in the Aksaray District, Aksaray Province, Turkey. Its population is 457 (2021).
