= Bostanlık, Aksaray =

Bostanlık
- Village
- Location within Turkey Location within Turkey Central Anatolia
- Coordinates: 38.6112°N 33.9012°E
- Country: Turkey
- Province: Aksaray
- District: Aksaray
- Population (2021): 29
- Time zone: UTC+3 (TRT)

Bostanlık is a village in the Aksaray District, Aksaray Province, Turkey. Its population is 29 (2021).
