= Karaören, Aksaray =

Karaören
- Village
- Location within Turkey Location within Turkey Central Anatolia
- Country: Turkey
- Province: Aksaray
- District: Aksaray
- Population (2021): 1,605
- Time zone: UTC+3 (TRT)

Karaören is a village in the Aksaray District, Aksaray Province, Turkey. Its population is 1,605 (2021).
