= Çolaknebi, Aksaray =

Çolaknebi
- Village
- Location within Turkey Location within Turkey Central Anatolia
- Coordinates: 38°35′35″N 33°59′15″E
- Country: Turkey
- Province: Aksaray
- District: Aksaray
- Population (2021): 122
- Time zone: UTC+3 (TRT)

Çolaknebi is a village in the Aksaray District, Aksaray Province, Turkey. Its population is 122 (2021). The village is populated by Kurds.
