= Yalman, Aksaray =

Yalman
- Village
- Location within Turkey Location within Turkey Central Anatolia
- Coordinates: 38°32′N 34°24′E
- Country: Turkey
- Province: Aksaray
- District: Aksaray
- Population (2021): 273
- Time zone: UTC+3 (TRT)

Yalman is a village in the Aksaray District, Aksaray Province, Turkey. Its population is 273 (2021).
