= Boğazköy, Sarıyahşi =

Boğazköy
- Village
- Location within Turkey Location within Turkey Central Anatolia
- Coordinates: 38.9584°N 33.8865°E
- Country: Turkey
- Province: Aksaray
- District: Sarıyahşi
- Population (2021): 674
- Time zone: UTC+3 (TRT)

Boğazköy is a village in the Sarıyahşi District, Aksaray Province, Turkey. Its population is 674 (2021). Before the 2013 reorganisation, it was a town (belde).
