= Gücünkaya, Aksaray =

Gücünkaya
- Village
- Location within Turkey Location within Turkey Central Anatolia
- Coordinates: 38°23′N 34°08′E
- Country: Turkey
- Province: Aksaray
- District: Aksaray
- Population (2021): 1,222
- Time zone: UTC+3 (TRT)

Gücünkaya is a village in the Aksaray District, Aksaray Province, Turkey. Its population is 1,222 (2021).
