= Ataköy, Aksaray =

Ataköy
- Village
- Location within Turkey Location within Turkey Central Anatolia
- Coordinates: 38.3514°N 33.9121°E
- Country: Turkey
- Province: Aksaray
- District: Aksaray
- Population (2021): 206
- Time zone: UTC+3 (TRT)

Ataköy is a village in the Aksaray District, Aksaray Province, Turkey. Its population is 206 (2021).
