= Ekecikgödeler, Aksaray =

Ekecikgödeler
- Village
- Location within Turkey Location within Turkey Central Anatolia
- Coordinates: 38°36′N 34°02′E
- Country: Turkey
- Province: Aksaray
- District: Aksaray
- Population (2021): 199
- Time zone: UTC+3 (TRT)

Ekecikgödeler, formerly known as Gödeler, is a village in the Aksaray District, Aksaray Province, Turkey. Its population is 199 (2021). The village is populated by Kurds.
