= Yanyurt, Aksaray =

Yanyurt
- Village
- Location within Turkey Location within Turkey Central Anatolia
- Coordinates: 38°36′N 34°08′E
- Country: Turkey
- Province: Aksaray
- District: Aksaray
- Population (2021): 320
- Time zone: UTC+3 (TRT)

Yanyurt (Kurdish: Kurdalo) is a village in the Aksaray District, Aksaray Province, Turkey. Its population is 320 (2021). The village is populated by Kurds.
