= Tatlıca, Aksaray =

Tatlıca
- Village
- Location within Turkey Location within Turkey Central Anatolia
- Country: Turkey
- Province: Aksaray
- District: Aksaray
- Population (2021): 432
- Time zone: UTC+3 (TRT)

Tatlıca is a village in the Aksaray District, Aksaray Province, Turkey. Its population is 432 (2021).
