= Gültepe, Aksaray =

Gültepe
- Village
- Location within Turkey Location within Turkey Central Anatolia
- Country: Turkey
- Province: Aksaray
- District: Aksaray
- Population (2021): 207
- Time zone: UTC+3 (TRT)

Gültepe or Tepesidelik is a village in the Aksaray District, Aksaray Province, Turkey. Its population is 207 (2021). The village is populated by Kurds.
