= Darıhüyük, Aksaray =

Darıhüyük
- Village
- Location within Turkey Location within Turkey Central Anatolia
- Coordinates: 38°21′N 33°50′E
- Country: Turkey
- Province: Aksaray
- District: Aksaray
- Population (2021): 232
- Time zone: UTC+3 (TRT)

Darıhüyük is a village in the Aksaray District, Aksaray Province, Turkey. Its population is 232 (2021).
