= Çekiçler, Aksaray =

Çekiçler
- Village
- Location within Turkey Location within Turkey Central Anatolia
- Country: Turkey
- Province: Aksaray
- District: Aksaray
- Population (2021): 531
- Time zone: UTC+3 (TRT)

Çekiçler is a village in the Aksaray District, Aksaray Province, Turkey. Its population is 621 (2023). The village is populated by Kurds.
