= İsmailağatolu, Aksaray =

İsmailağatolu
- Village
- Location within Turkey Location within Turkey Central Anatolia
- Coordinates: 38°24′N 33°56′E
- Country: Turkey
- Province: Aksaray
- District: Aksaray
- Population (2021): 453
- Time zone: UTC+3 (TRT)

İsmailağatolu is a village in the Aksaray District, Aksaray Province, Turkey. Its population is 453 (2021).
