= Elmacık, Aksaray =

Elmacık
- Village
- Location within Turkey Location within Turkey Central Anatolia
- Country: Turkey
- Province: Aksaray
- District: Aksaray
- Population (2021): 673
- Time zone: UTC+3 (TRT)

Elmacık is a village in the Aksaray District, Aksaray Province, Turkey. Its population is 673 (2021).
