= Sarıağıl, Aksaray =

Sarıağıl
- Village
- Location within Turkey Location within Turkey Central Anatolia
- Country: Turkey
- Province: Aksaray
- District: Aksaray
- Population (2021): 268
- Time zone: UTC+3 (TRT)

Sarıağıl is a village in the Aksaray District, Aksaray Province, Turkey. Its population is 268 (2021). The village is populated by Kurds.
