= Karaçayır, Aksaray =

Karaçayır
- Village
- Location within Turkey Location within Turkey Central Anatolia
- Country: Turkey
- Province: Aksaray
- District: Aksaray
- Population (2021): 44
- Time zone: UTC+3 (TRT)

Karaçayır is a village in the Aksaray District, Aksaray Province, Turkey. Its population is 44 (2021). The village is populated by Kurds.
