= Göksügüzel, Aksaray =

Göksügüzel
- Village
- Location within Turkey Location within Turkey Central Anatolia
- Coordinates: 38.5147°N 34.1618°E
- Country: Turkey
- Province: Aksaray
- District: Aksaray
- Population (2021): 457
- Time zone: UTC+3 (TRT)

Göksügüzel is a village in the Aksaray District, Aksaray Province, Turkey. Its population is 306 (2021).
