= Yalnızceviz, Aksaray =

Yalnızceviz
- Village
- Location within Turkey Location within Turkey Central Anatolia
- Coordinates: 38°29′N 34°10′E
- Country: Turkey
- Province: Aksaray
- District: Aksaray
- Population (2021): 362
- Time zone: UTC+3 (TRT)

Yalnızceviz is a village in the Aksaray District, Aksaray Province, Turkey. Its population is 362 (2021). The village is populated by Turks.
