= Hırkatolu, Aksaray =

Hırkatolu
- Village
- Location within Turkey Location within Turkey Central Anatolia
- Coordinates: 38°24′28″N 33°55′54″E
- Country: Turkey
- Province: Aksaray
- District: Aksaray
- Population (2021): 1,231
- Time zone: UTC+3 (TRT)

Hırkatolu is a village in the Aksaray District, Aksaray Province, Turkey. Its population is 1,231 (2021).
