= Hirfanlı Dam =

Coordinates: 39.2723°N 33.5188°E

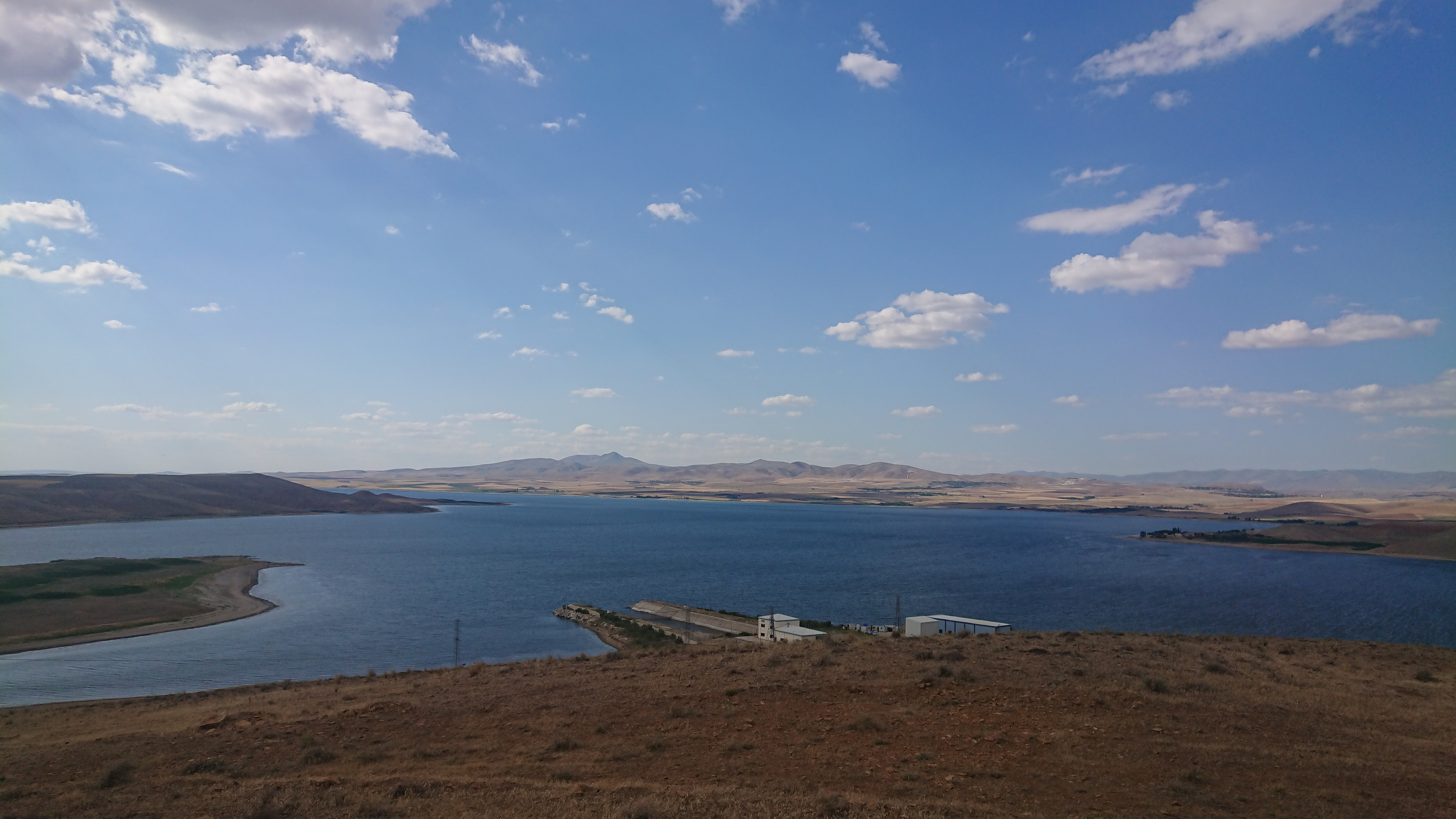
- View of the dam from above
- Location: Turkey
- Construction began: 1953
- Opening date: 1959

Dam and spillways
- Impounds: Kızılırmak River
- Height: 78 m

Reservoir
- Creates: Hirfanli Reservoir
- Total capacity: 5,980 hm^{3}

Power Station
- Installed capacity: 128 MW
- Annual generation: 400 GWh

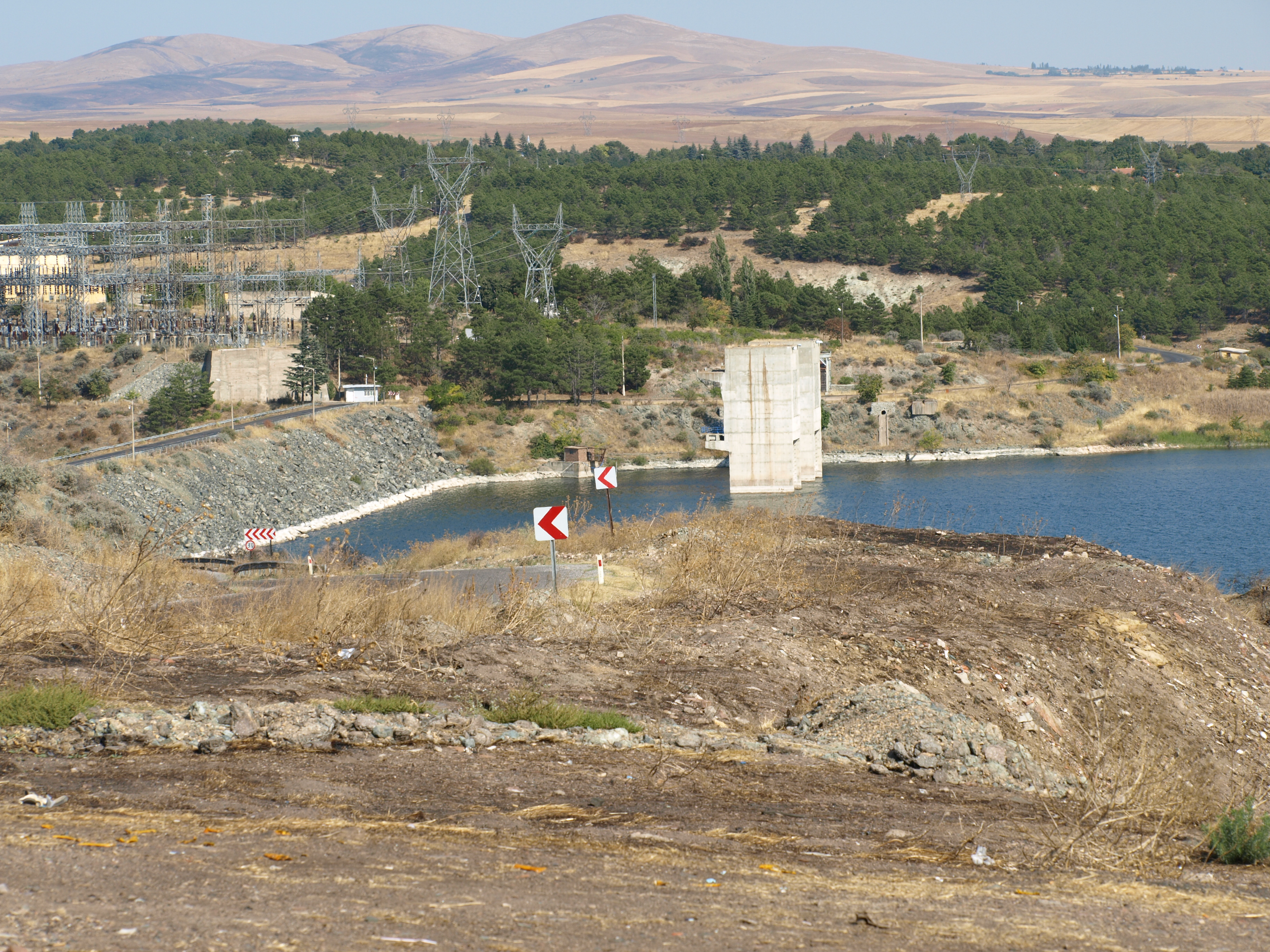
Dam from the side

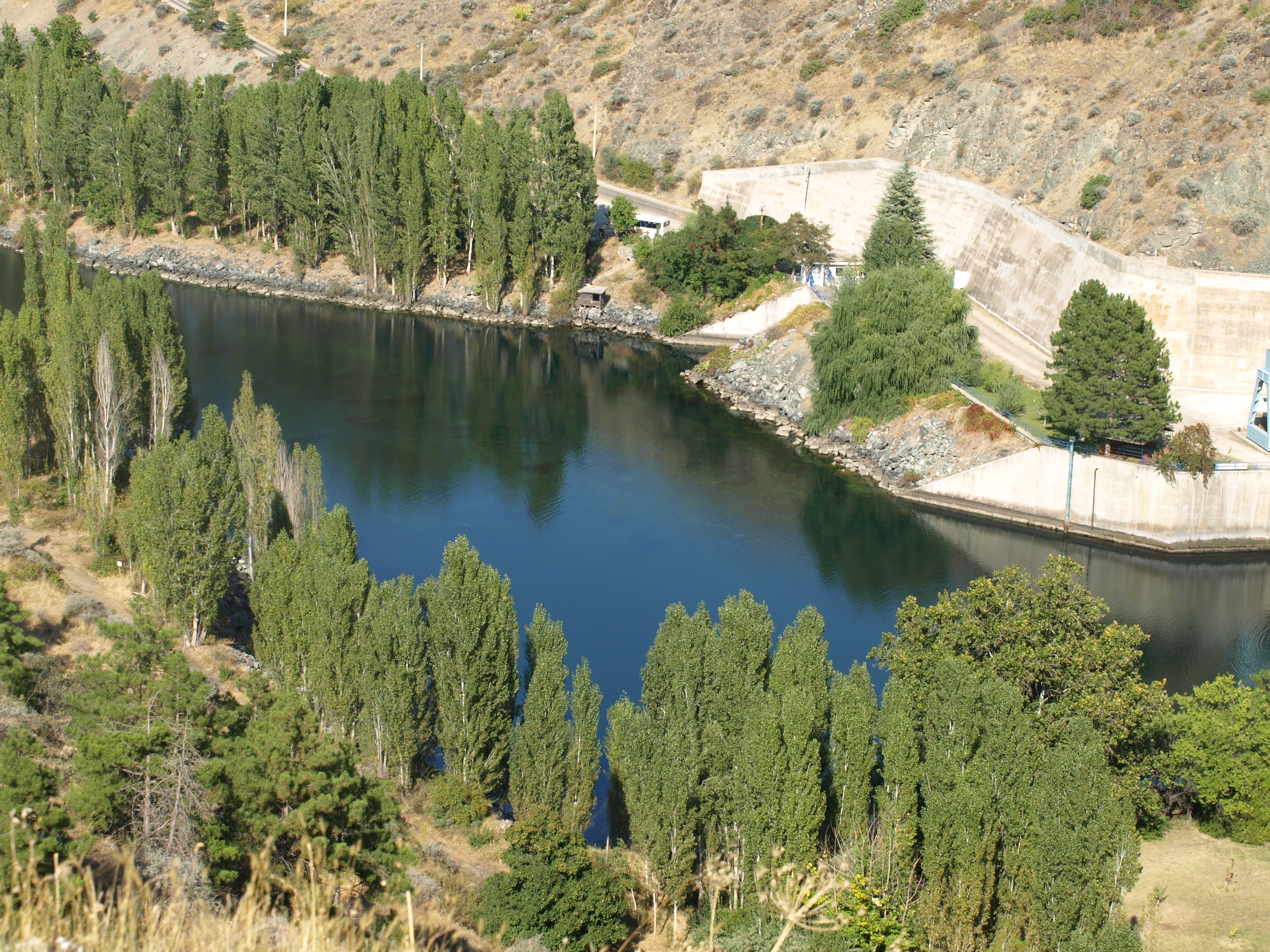
The Kızılırmak River seen below the Hirfanlı Dam

Hirfanlı Dam is a dam in Turkey. The development was backed by the Turkish State Hydraulic Works. It was built by Wimpey Construction and was completed in 1959.

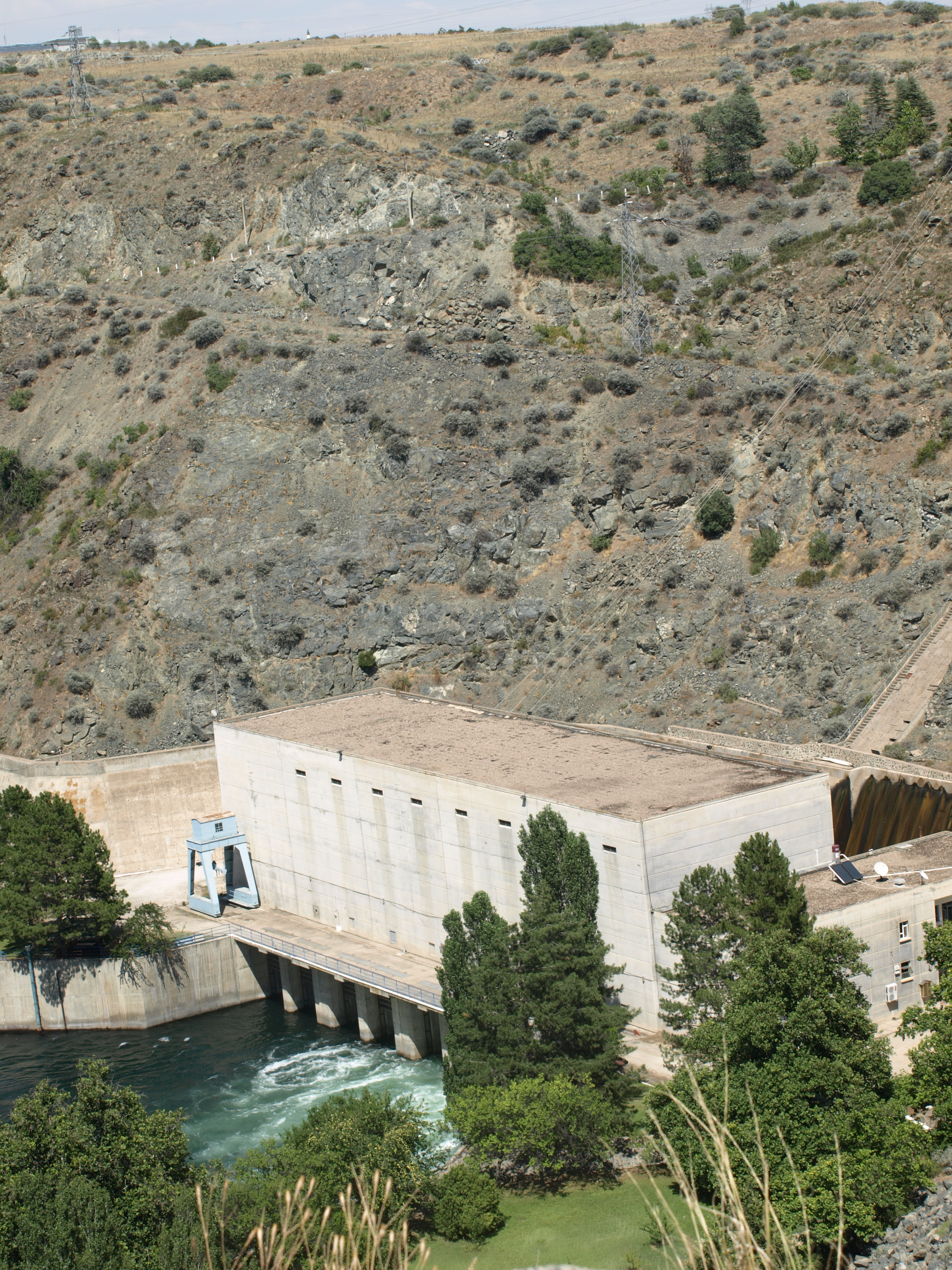
Hirfanli Dam Wall

== See also ==
- List of dams and reservoirs in Turkey

== Sources ==
- White, Valerie (1980). Wimpey: The first hundred years. George Wimpey.
