= Macarlı, Aksaray =

Macarlı
- Village
- Location within Turkey Location within Turkey Central Anatolia
- Coordinates: 38°35′N 33°59′E
- Country: Turkey
- Province: Aksaray
- District: Aksaray
- Population (2021): 20
- Time zone: UTC+3 (TRT)

Macarlı is a village in the Aksaray District, Aksaray Province, Turkey. Its population is 20 (2021). The village is populated by Kurds.
