= Büyükpörnekler, Aksaray =

Büyükpörnekler
- Village
- Location within Turkey Location within Turkey Central Anatolia
- Coordinates: 38.6293°N 34.2070°E
- Country: Turkey
- Province: Aksaray
- District: Aksaray
- Population (2021): 393
- Time zone: UTC+3 (TRT)

Büyükpörnekler (also: Pörnekler) is a village in the Aksaray District, Aksaray Province, Turkey. Its population is 393 (2021).
