= Ulukışla, Aksaray =

Ulukışla
- Village
- Location within Turkey Location within Turkey Central Anatolia
- Country: Turkey
- Province: Aksaray
- District: Aksaray
- Population (2021): 481
- Time zone: UTC+3 (TRT)

Ulukışla is a village in the Aksaray District, Aksaray Province, Turkey. Its population is 481 (2021). Before the 2013 reorganisation, it was a town (belde).
