= Bayındır, Aksaray =

Bayındır
- Village
- Location within Turkey Location within Turkey Central Anatolia
- Coordinates: 38.5895°N 34.3257°E
- Country: Turkey
- Province: Aksaray
- District: Aksaray
- Population (2021): 42
- Time zone: UTC+3 (TRT)

Bayındır is a village in the Aksaray District, Aksaray Province, Turkey. Its population is 42 (2021).
