= Yuva, Aksaray =

Yuva
- Village
- Location within Turkey Location within Turkey Central Anatolia
- Coordinates: 38.2447°N 34.1528°E
- Country: Turkey
- Province: Aksaray
- District: Aksaray
- Population (2021): 1,347
- Time zone: UTC+3 (TRT)

Yuva is a village in the Aksaray District, Aksaray Province, Turkey. Its population is 1,347 (2021). Before the 2013 reorganisation, it was a town (belde).
