= Akhisar, Aksaray =

Akhisar
- Village
- Location within Turkey Location within Turkey Central Anatolia
- Coordinates: 38.2909°N 34.0970°E
- Country: Turkey
- Province: Aksaray
- District: Aksaray
- Population (2021): 918
- Time zone: UTC+3 (TRT)

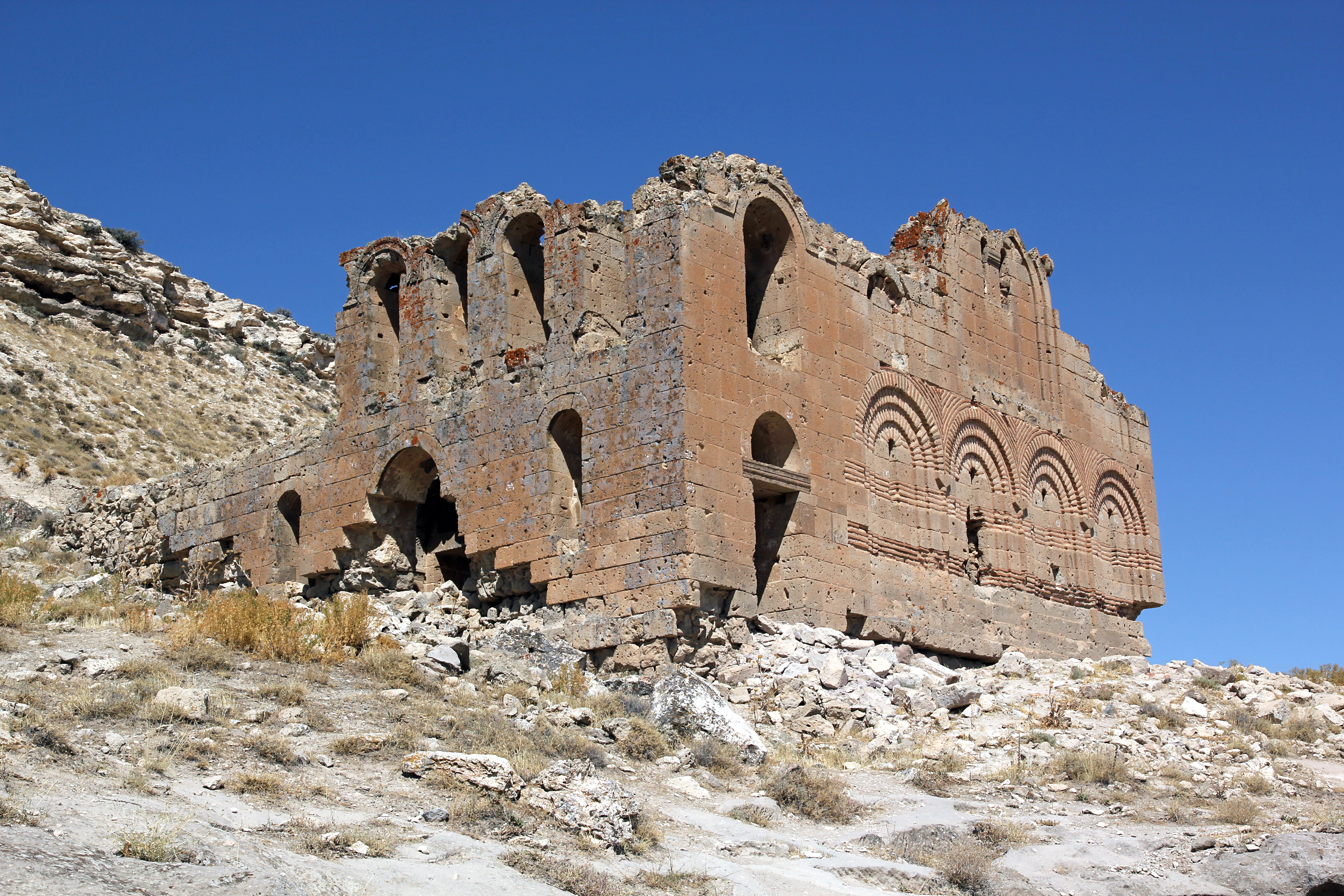
Çanlı Kilise, Byzantine church near Aksaray, Cappadocia, Türkiye, view from the south

Akhisar, formerly known as Hisn Sinan, is a village in the Aksaray District, Aksaray Province, Turkey. Its population is 918 (2021).
