= Kalebalta, Aksaray =

Kalebalta Gundê Qelê
- Village
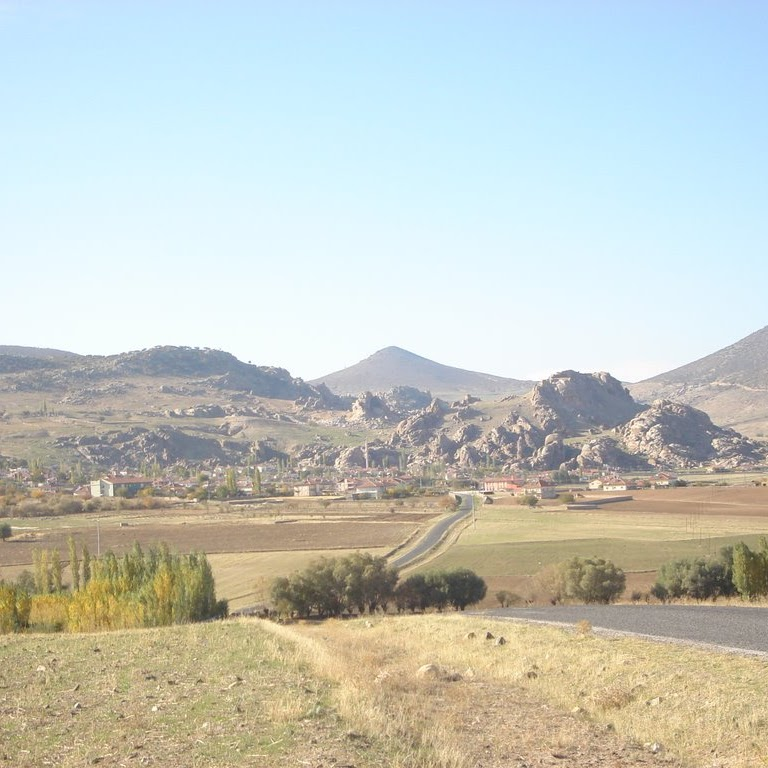

- Location within Turkey Location within Turkey Central Anatolia
- Coordinates: 38°35′N 34°12′E
- Country: Turkey
- Province: Aksaray
- District: Aksaray
- Population (2021): 680
- Time zone: UTC+3 (TRT)

Kalebalta (Kurdish: Gundê Qelê) is a village in the Aksaray District, Aksaray Province, Turkey. Its population is 680 (2021).

The name is derived from the turkish words "kale," meaning fortress and "balta" meaning axe.

The village is populated by Kurds.
