= Akin, Aksaray =

Akin
- Village
- Location within Turkey Location within Turkey Central Anatolia
- Coordinates: 38.4545°N 34.0455°E
- Country: Turkey
- Province: Aksaray
- District: Aksaray
- Population (2021): 588
- Time zone: UTC+3 (TRT)

Akin is a village in the Aksaray District, Aksaray Province, Turkey. Its population is 588 (2021). The village is populated by kurdified Turkmens .
