= Ulukışlatolu, Aksaray =

Ulukışlatolu
- Village
- Location within Turkey Location within Turkey Central Anatolia
- Coordinates: 38°22′N 33°53′E
- Country: Turkey
- Province: Aksaray
- District: Aksaray
- Population (2021): 144
- Time zone: UTC+3 (TRT)

Ulukışlatolu is a village in the Aksaray District, Aksaray Province, Turkey. Its population is 144 (2021).
