= Karakova, Aksaray =

Karakova
- Village
- Location within Turkey Location within Turkey Central Anatolia
- Country: Turkey
- Province: Aksaray
- District: Aksaray
- Population (2021): 51
- Time zone: UTC+3 (TRT)

Karakova is a village in the Aksaray District, Aksaray Province, Turkey. Its population is 51 (2021). The village is populated by Kurds.
