= Bağlı, Aksaray =

Bağlı
- Village
- Location within Turkey Location within Turkey Central Anatolia
- Coordinates: 38°15′57″N 34°04′09″E
- Country: Turkey
- Province: Aksaray
- District: Aksaray
- Population (2021): 578
- Time zone: UTC+3 (TRT)

Bağlı is a village in the Aksaray District, Aksaray Province, Turkey. Its population is 578 (2021).
