= Hatipoğlutolu, Aksaray =

Hatipoğlutolu
- Village
- Location within Turkey Location within Turkey Central Anatolia
- Coordinates: 38°23′N 33°55′E
- Country: Turkey
- Province: Aksaray
- District: Aksaray
- Population (2021): 564
- Time zone: UTC+3 (TRT)

Hatipoğlutolu is a village in the Aksaray District, Aksaray Province, Turkey. Its population is 564 (2021).
