= Sevinçli, Aksaray =

Sevinçli
- Village
- Location within Turkey Location within Turkey Central Anatolia
- Country: Turkey
- Province: Aksaray
- District: Aksaray
- Population (2021): 1,618
- Time zone: UTC+3 (TRT)

Sevinçli is a village in the Aksaray District, Aksaray Province, Turkey. Its population is 1,618 (2021). Before the 2013 reorganisation, it was a town (belde).
