= Yaylak, Sarıyahşi =

Yaylak
- Village
- Location within Turkey Location within Turkey Central Anatolia
- Country: Turkey
- Province: Aksaray
- District: Sarıyahşi
- Population (2021): 221
- Time zone: UTC+3 (TRT)

Yaylak is a village in the Sarıyahşi District, Aksaray Province, Turkey. Its population is 221 (2021).
