= Cankıllı, Aksaray =

Cankıllı
- Village
- Location within Turkey Location within Turkey Central Anatolia
- Coordinates: 38°36′N 34°04′E
- Country: Turkey
- Province: Aksaray
- District: Aksaray
- Population (2021): 309
- Time zone: UTC+3 (TRT)

Cankıllı (Kurdish: Canqilo) is a village in the Aksaray District, Aksaray Province, Turkey. Its population is 309 (2021). The village is populated by Kurds.
