= Doğantarla, Aksaray =

Doğantarla
- Village
- Location within Turkey Location within Turkey Central Anatolia
- Coordinates: 38.364°N 34.214°E
- Country: Turkey
- Province: Aksaray
- District: Aksaray
- Population (2021): 1,541
- Time zone: UTC+3 (TRT)

Doğantarla is a village in the Aksaray District, Aksaray Province, Turkey. Its population is 1,541 (2021). Before the 2013 reorganisation, it was a town (belde).
