= Akçakent, Aksaray =

Akçakent
- Village
- Location within Turkey Location within Turkey Central Anatolia
- Coordinates: 38°05′00″N 34°05′27″E
- Country: Turkey
- Province: Aksaray
- District: Aksaray
- Population (2021): 842
- Time zone: UTC+3 (TRT)

Akçakent is a village in the Aksaray District, Aksaray Province, Turkey. Its population is 842 (2021). Before the 2013 reorganisation, it was a town (belde).
