= Seleciköse =

- Village
- Location within Turkey Location within Turkey Central Anatolia
- Coordinates: 38°22′N 33°56′E
- Country: Turkey
- Province: Aksaray
- District: Aksaray
- Population (2021): 621
- Time zone: UTC+3 (TRT)

Seleciköse is a village in the Aksaray District, Aksaray Province, Turkey. Its population is 621 (2021).
