= Demirci, Gülağaç =

Demirci
- Municipality
- Location in Turkey Demirci (Turkey Central Anatolia)
- Coordinates: 38°38′N 34°28′E
- Country: Turkey
- Province: Aksaray
- District: Gülağaç
- Population (2021): 4,051
- Time zone: UTC+3 (TRT)

Demirci is a town (belde) and municipality in the Gülağaç District, Aksaray Province, Turkey. Its population is 4,051 (2021).
