= Karakuyu, Aksaray =

Karakuyu
- Village
- Location within Turkey Location within Turkey Central Anatolia
- Country: Turkey
- Province: Aksaray
- District: Aksaray
- Population (2021): 131
- Time zone: UTC+3 (TRT)

Karakuyu is a village in the Aksaray District, Aksaray Province, Turkey. Its population is 131 (2021).
