= Topakkaya, Aksaray =

Topakkaya
- Municipality
- Location in Turkey Topakkaya (Turkey Central Anatolia)
- Coordinates: 38°27′N 33°56′E
- Country: Turkey
- Province: Aksaray
- District: Aksaray
- Population (2021): 2,447
- Time zone: UTC+3 (TRT)

Topakkaya is a town (belde) and municipality in the Aksaray District, Aksaray Province, Turkey. Its population is 2,447 (2021).
