= Acıpınar, Aksaray =

Acıpınar
- Village
- Location within Turkey Location within Turkey Central Anatolia
- Coordinates: 38.52878°N 33.85090°E
- Country: Turkey
- Province: Aksaray
- District: Aksaray
- Population (2021): 785
- Time zone: UTC+3 (TRT)

Acıpınar is a village in the Aksaray District, Aksaray Province, Turkey. Its population is 785 (2021). Before the 2013 reorganisation, it was a town (belde).
