= Altınkaya, Aksaray =

Altınkaya
- Village
- Location within Turkey Location within Turkey Central Anatolia
- Coordinates: 38.6187°N 33.7866°E
- Country: Turkey
- Province: Aksaray
- District: Aksaray
- Population (2021): 1,260
- Time zone: UTC+3 (TRT)

Altınkaya (formerly: Çardak) is a village in the Aksaray District, Aksaray Province, Turkey. Its population is 1,260 (2021). Before the 2013 reorganisation, it was a town (belde).
