= Taşpınar, Aksaray =

Taşpınar
- Municipality
- Location in Turkey Taşpınar (Turkey Central Anatolia)
- Coordinates: 38°11′N 34°01′E
- Country: Turkey
- Province: Aksaray
- District: Aksaray
- Elevation: 1,050 m (3,440 ft)
- Population (2021): 2,759
- Time zone: UTC+3 (TRT)
- Area code: 0382

Taşpınar is a town (belde) and municipality in the Aksaray District, Aksaray Province, Turkey. Its population is 2,759 (2021).

== Geography ==
Taşpınar is in the Anatolian plateau, just west of Mount Hasan. The average altitude is 1,050 metres (3,440 ft).

== History ==
The earliest residents of the village were the members of a tribe from Azerbaijan in 1515. Eventually, people from nearby villages also settled in Taşpınar. Meanwhile, a group of Taşpınar residents chose to live in Hotamış, another town roughly 100 kilometres (62 mi) south west of Taşpınar. In 1957 Taşpınar was declared a seat of township.

== Economy ==
The main economic activity is handmade rugs. Taşpınar rugs are especially famous for their high density of knots. (40·40 in 10 cm^{2} or more in older rugs.) Although the town is situated in a volcanic plateau which is supposed to be fertile, because of the low annual rainfall, agricultural income is limited. Some Taşpınar residents work in the light industry of nearby Aksaray.

== Transportation ==
Taşpınar is 27 kilometres (17 mi) south of Aksaray on the main highway D.750, from Ankara to Adana, which makes it almost the midpoint of D 90 highway.
