= Yeşiltepe, Aksaray =

Yeşiltepe
- Municipality
- Location in Turkey Yeşiltepe (Turkey Central Anatolia)
- Coordinates: 38°28′N 33°46′E
- Country: Turkey
- Province: Aksaray
- District: Aksaray
- Population (2021): 2,276
- Time zone: UTC+3 (TRT)

Yeşiltepe is a town (belde) and municipality in the Aksaray District, Aksaray Province, Turkey. Its population is 2,276 (2021).
