= Bağlıkaya, Aksaray =

Bağlıkaya
- Municipality
- Location in Turkey Bağlıkaya (Turkey Central Anatolia)
- Coordinates: 38.5026°N 33.9432°E
- Country: Turkey
- Province: Aksaray
- District: Aksaray
- Population (2021): 2,965
- Time zone: UTC+3 (TRT)

Bağlıkaya is a town (belde) and municipality in the Aksaray District, Aksaray Province, Turkey. Its population is 2,965 (2021).
