= Sapmaz, Aksaray =

Sapmaz
- Village
- Location within Turkey Location within Turkey Central Anatolia
- Country: Turkey
- Province: Aksaray
- District: Aksaray
- Population (2021): 511
- Time zone: UTC+3 (TRT)

Sapmaz is a village in the Aksaray District, Aksaray Province, Turkey. Its population is 511 (2021).
