= Sağlık, Aksaray =

Sağlık
- Municipality
- Location in Turkey Sağlık (Turkey Central Anatolia)
- Coordinates: 38°18′N 34°04′E
- Country: Turkey
- Province: Aksaray
- District: Aksaray
- Population (2021): 2,471
- Time zone: UTC+3 (TRT)

Sağlık is a town (belde) and municipality in the Aksaray District, Aksaray Province, Turkey. Its population is 2,471 (2021).
