= Yenipınar, Aksaray =

Yenipınar
- Village
- Location within Turkey Location within Turkey Central Anatolia
- Country: Turkey
- Province: Aksaray
- District: Aksaray
- Population (2021): 769
- Time zone: UTC+3 (TRT)

Yenipınar is a village in the Aksaray District, Aksaray Province, Turkey. Its population is 769 (2021).
