= Boyalı, Aksaray =

Boyalı
- Village
- Location within Turkey Location within Turkey Central Anatolia
- Coordinates: 38.5894°N 33.9533°E
- Country: Turkey
- Province: Aksaray
- District: Aksaray
- Population (2021): 206
- Time zone: UTC+3 (TRT)

Boyalı is a village in the Aksaray District, Aksaray Province, Turkey. Its population is 206 (2021).
