= Şeyhler, Aksaray =

Şeyhler
- Village
- Country: Turkey
- Province: Aksaray
- District: Aksaray
- Population (2021): 69
- Time zone: UTC+3 (TRT)

Şeyhler is a village in the Aksaray District, Aksaray Province, Turkey. Its population is 69 (2021). The village is populated by Kurds.
