= Yenikent, Aksaray =

Yenikent
- Municipality
- Location in Turkey Yenikent (Turkey Central Anatolia)
- Coordinates: 38°21′N 33°45′E
- Country: Turkey
- Province: Aksaray
- District: Aksaray
- Population (2021): 5,359
- Time zone: UTC+3 (TRT)

Yenikent is a town (belde) and municipality in the Aksaray District, Aksaray Province, Turkey. Its population is 5,359 (2021).
