= Ağzıkarahan, Aksaray =

Ağzıkarahan
- Village
- Location within Turkey Location within Turkey Central Anatolia
- Coordinates: 38°27′N 34°08′E
- Country: Turkey
- Province: Aksaray
- District: Aksaray
- Population (2021): 201
- Time zone: UTC+3 (TRT)

Ağzıkarahan is a village in the Aksaray District, Aksaray Province, Turkey. Its population is 201 (2021).
