= Sarıyahşi =

- Municipality
- Location in Turkey Sarıyahşi (Turkey Central Anatolia)
- Coordinates: 38°59′N 33°51′E
- Country: Turkey
- Province: Aksaray
- District: Sarıyahşi

Government
  - Mayor: Fatih Ünsal (MHP)
- Elevation: 870 m (2,850 ft)
- Population (2021): 3,543
- Time zone: UTC+3 (TRT)
- Area code: 0382
- Website: sariyahsi.bel.tr

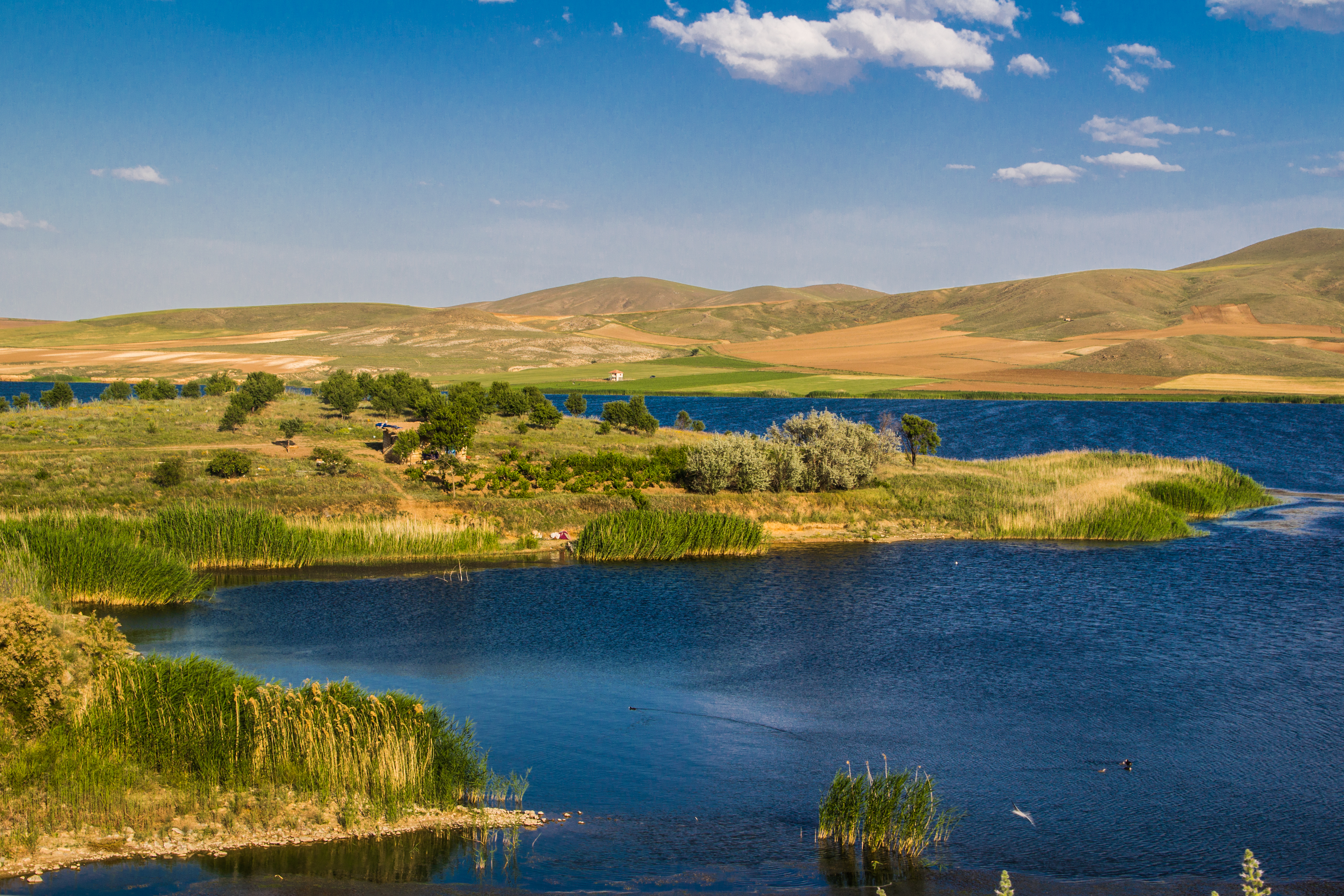
Sarıyahşi, Aksaray Province, Turkey.

Sarıyahşi is a town in Aksaray Province in the Central Anatolia region of Turkey, at a distance of 110 km (68 mi) from the province seat of Aksaray. It is the seat of Sarıyahşi District. Its population is 3,543 (2021).

The town of Sarıyahşi is a small rural centre providing schools and other basic amenities to the surrounding countryside.
