= Gülpınar, Gülağaç =

Gülpınar
- Municipality
- Location in Turkey Gülpınar (Turkey Central Anatolia)
- Coordinates: 38.4189°N 34.3636°E
- Country: Turkey
- Province: Aksaray
- District: Gülağaç
- Population (2021): 2,807
- Time zone: UTC+3 (TRT)

Gülpınar is a town (belde) and municipality in the Gülağaç District, Aksaray Province, Turkey. Its population is 2,807 (2021).
