= Helvadere =

Settlement in Turkey

- Municipality
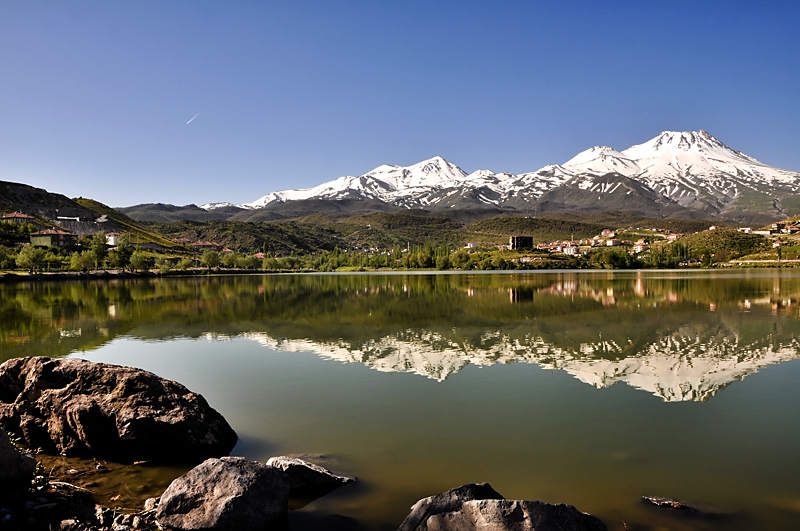
- Helvadere Kasabası

- Location within Turkey Location within Turkey Central Anatolia
- Coordinates: 38°12′N 34°12′E
- Country: Turkey
- Province: Aksaray
- District: Aksaray
- Elevation: 1,340 m (4,400 ft)
- Population (2021): 2,564
- Time zone: UTC+3 (TRT)
- Area code: 0382

Helvadere is a town (belde) and municipality in the Aksaray District, Aksaray Province, Turkey. Its population is 2,564 (2021).

== Geography ==
Helvadere is on the western slopes of Mount Hasan at about 1,350 m (4,430 ft). It is 30 km (19 mi) south of Aksaray.

== History ==
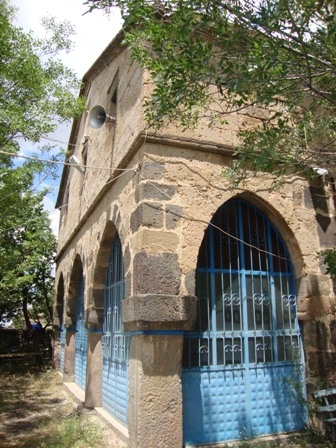
The Yenii Camii, (New Mosque), sometimes called Kilise Camii, and formerly known as (“Agios Nikolaos”) Saint Nicholas Church.

The ancient name of the town was Mokissos and later renamed Justinianopolis (named after Justinian). Eventually, the town lost its former importance and in the Middle Ages it was a small village named Hardaldere. Evliya Çelebi in his Seyahatname describes hardaldere as a village of 65 houses; the majority of the population being Turk, but also with a Greek minority. In the early 20th century, the name was Halvadara. But in 1968 Halvadara was declared a town named Helvadere.

Near Helvadere are the ruins of the ancient town of Nora, which was an important town in Hellenistic Capadocia.

== Economy ==
Helvadere is a typical agricultural town. Potato, apple and cherry are among the more important crops. Some members of the town work in western Europe as industrial workers (gastarbeiter) and they also contribute to the town's economy.

== Churches ==
- Kemerli Kilise, "Arched church", formerly known as the Church of the Holy Trinity or Church of St. George
- Yardıbaş Kilise
- Süt Kilise, “Milk church"
- Bozboyun Kilise, "Gray neck church"
- Çukurkent Kilisesi, "Pit city church"
- Tepe Kilisesi, "Hill church"
- Sarıgöl Kilisesi, "Yellow lake church"
- Kale Kilisesi, "Castle Church"
- Kara Kilise "Dark Church"

The ruins of Karahan (Eshab-ı Kefh Han) from the Seljuks period is also located in Mokissos.
