= Çatin, Ortaköy =

Çatin
- Village
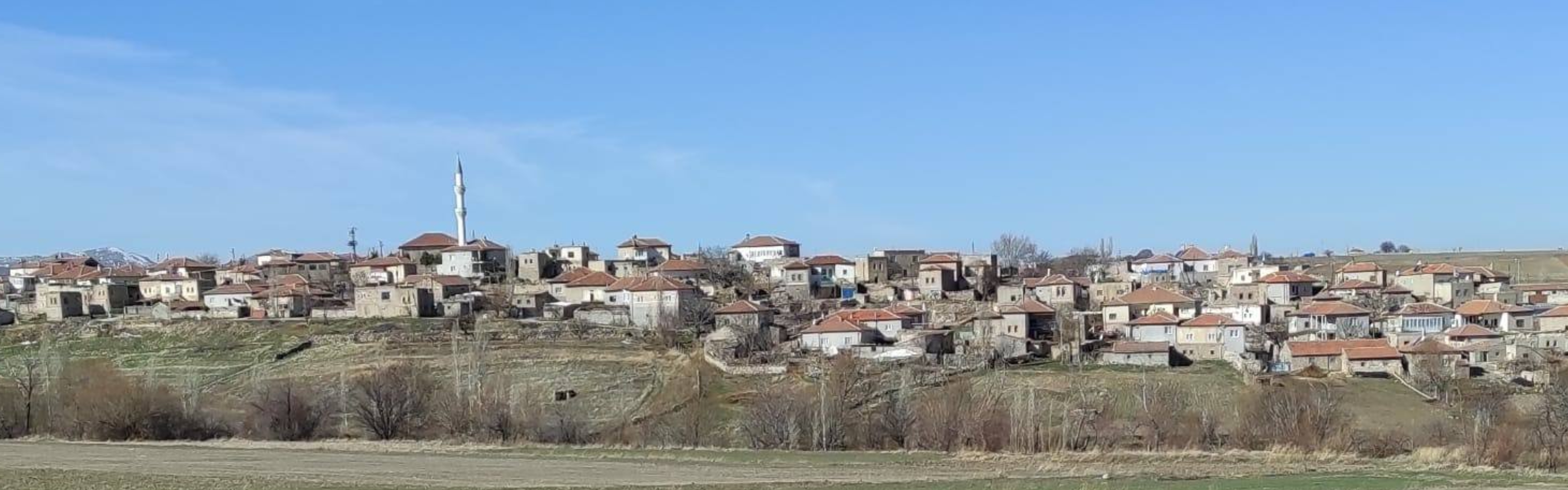
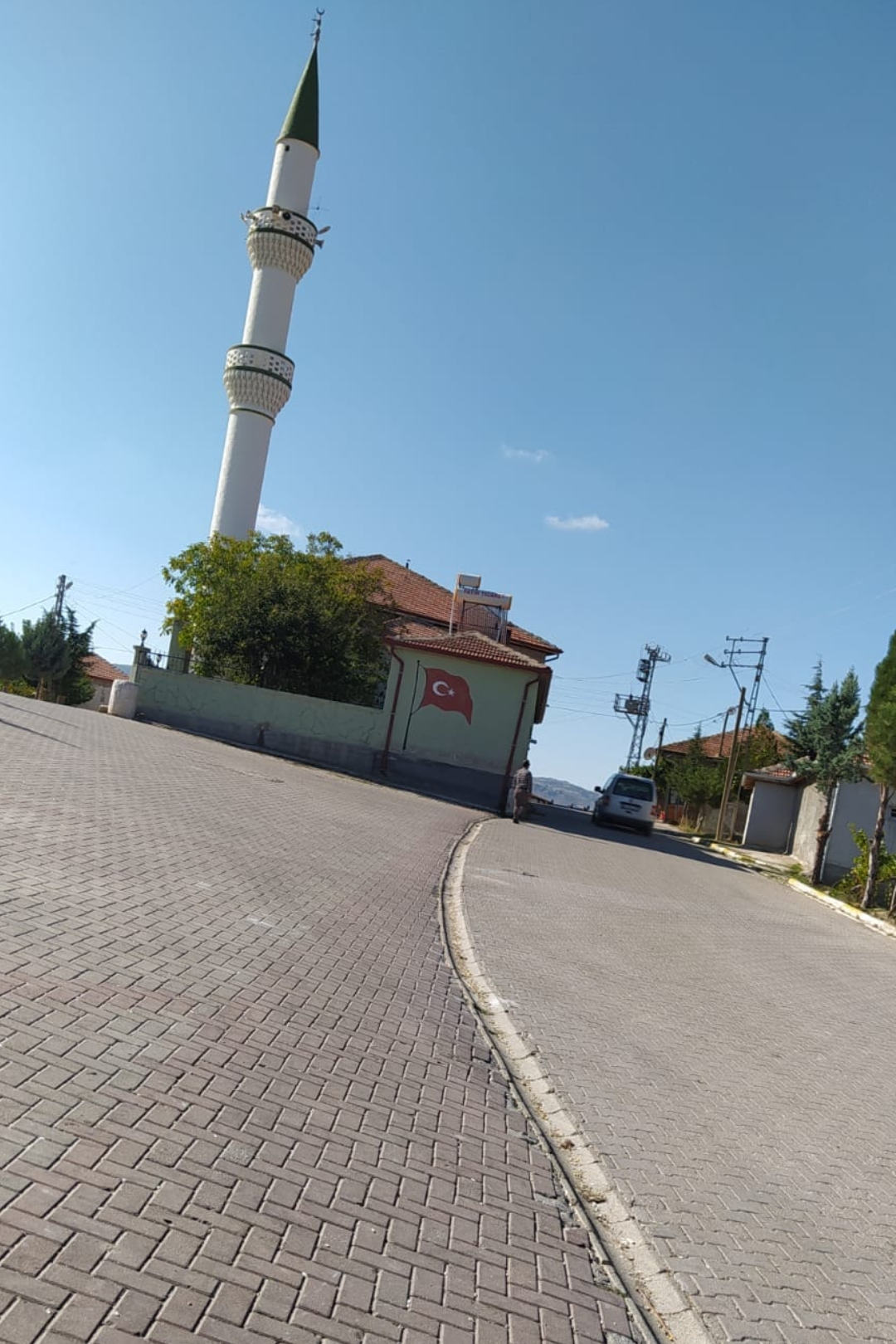
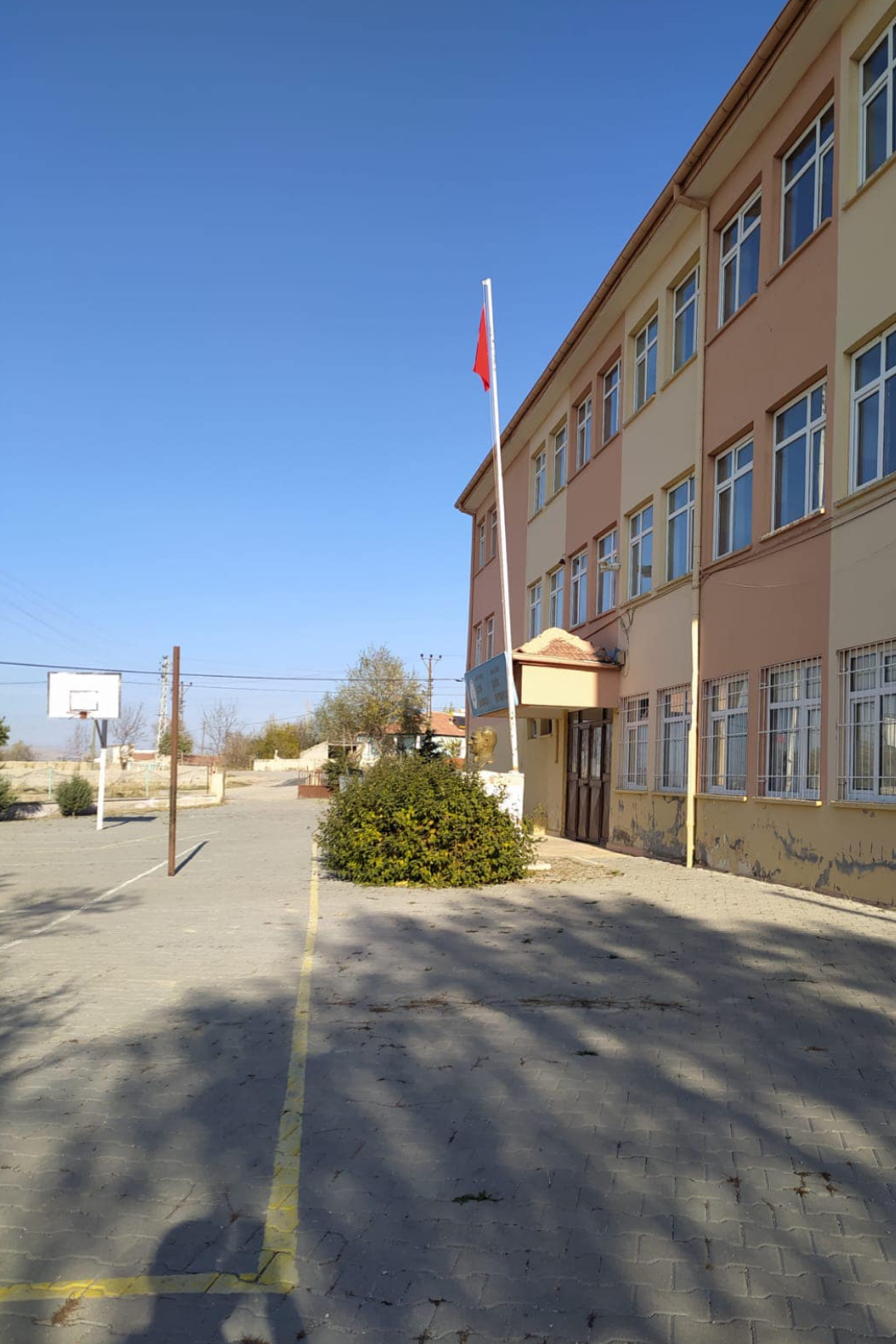
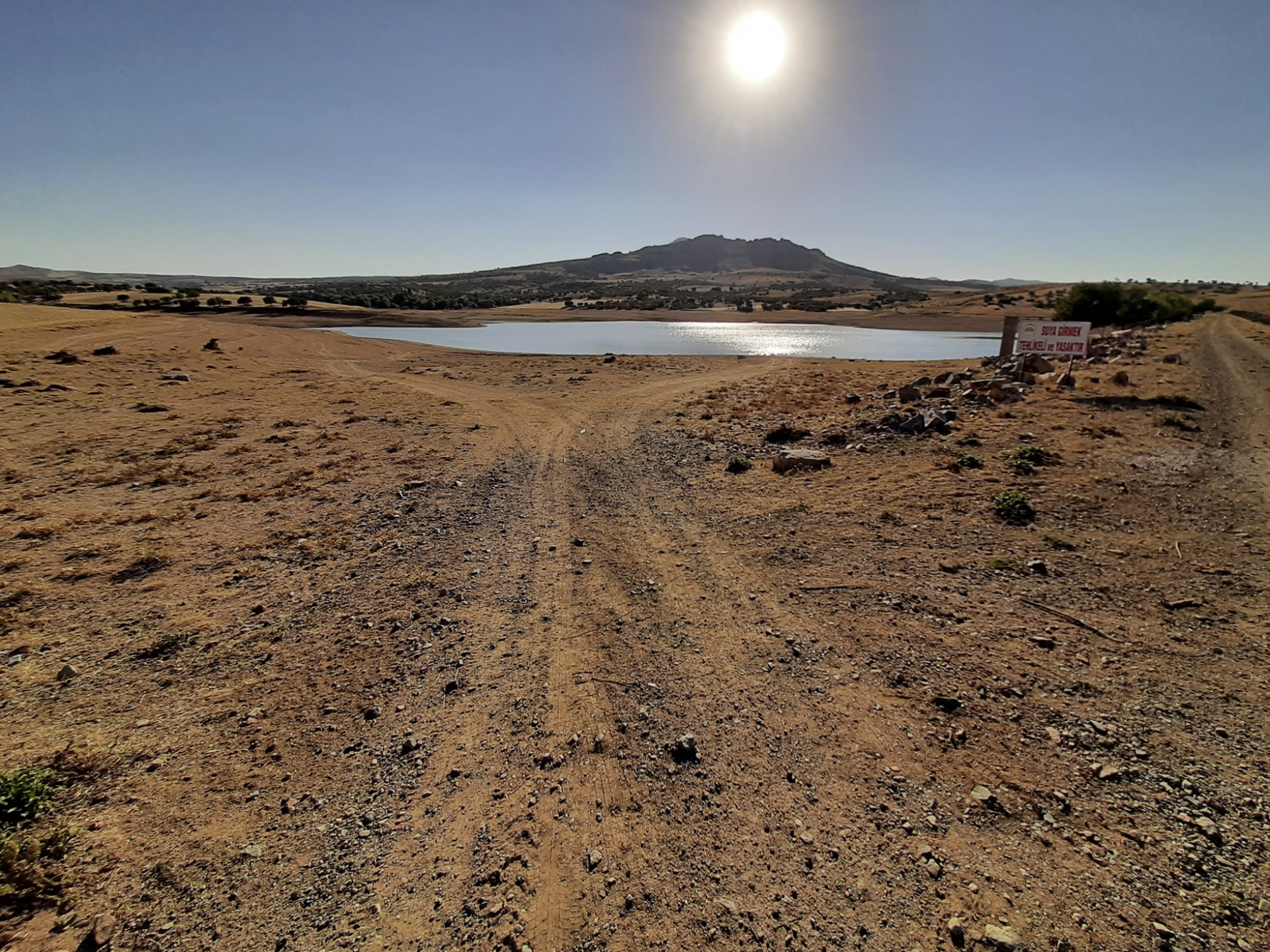
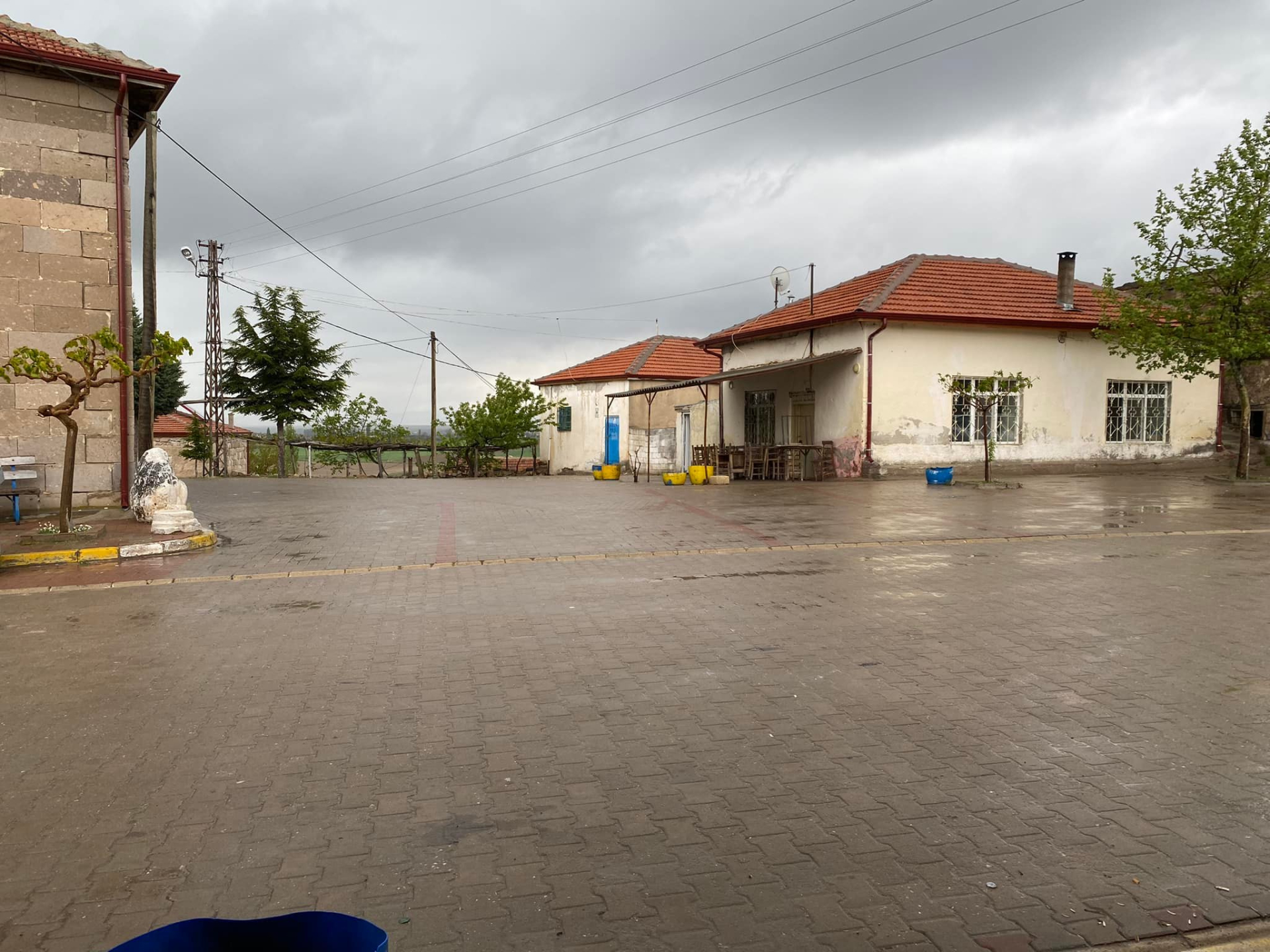
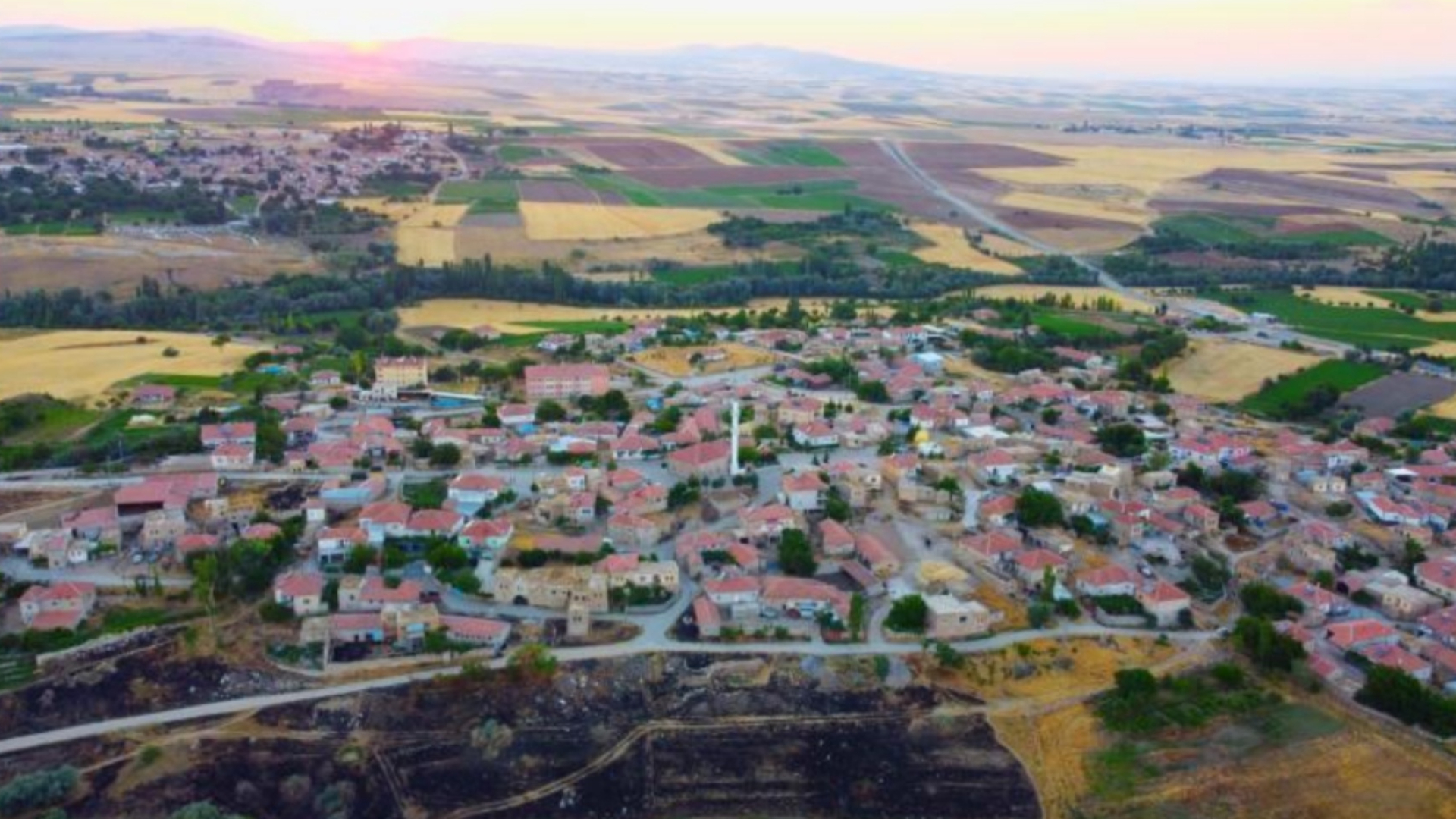
- Top to bottom and left to right: View of the village from the cotton fields, 2) Çatin Village Mosque, 3) Çatin Primary School, 4) Çatin Pond, 5) Village square (Seki), 6) View of the village taken with a drone

- Location within Turkey Location within Turkey Central Anatolia
- Coordinates: 38°40′46″N 34°10′57″E
- Country: Turkey
- Province: Aksaray
- District: Ortaköy
- Elevation: 1,125 m (3,691 ft)
- Population (2022): 433
- Time zone: UTC+3 (TRT)
- Postal code: 68601
- Area code: 0382
- Website: www.catinkoyu68.com

Çatin (also: Çetin) is a village in the Ortaköy District of Aksaray province in Turkey's Central Anatolia Region. Its population is 433 (2022). The village covers an area of 29.45 square kilometers and has an average elevation of 1,125 meters.

== History ==
The name of the village is mentioned as Çatin in the records of 1926.

== Geography ==
=== Location ===
Aksaray is located in the south of the village, Nevşehir in the east and Kırşehir in the north. As smaller settlements; There is Ozancık village in the east of the village, Cumali village in the west, Salarıgödeler village in the northwest, Yanyurt village in the south and Kümbet village in the north.

=== Climate and vegetation ===
Climate and Vegetation of the Village The continental climate, which is the typical and characteristic climate of the Central Anatolia Region, is dominant. Winters are cold and snowy. In spring, rain prevails, and in summer, drought prevails. Although it is not lush and not many, tree communities are found in places. The degraded oak groves, especially in the south of the village, are the prominent wooded areas.

=== Landforms ===
Landforms of the Village Generally, it has the average elevation of the Central Anatolia Region. The settlement area and land of the village are not excessive, but less rough. The places where the plains are dense are the areas called "Desert" in the east of the village, which are the most important and large agricultural lands of the village. Important elevations around the village; "Eaglerock" and "Ekecik" mountains. Although there is no stream, there is a medium-sized pond in the south of the village.

== Population ==
Historical population

Year	Pop.	±% p.a.
1935	728	—
1940	778	+1.34%
1945	878	+2.45%
1950	972	+2.06%
1955	1,108	+2.65%
1960	1,211	+1.79%
1965	1,279	+1.10%
1970	1,284	+0.08%
1975	1,242	−0.66%

Year	Pop.	±% p.a.
1980	1,073	−2.88%
1985	1,034	−0.74%
1990	927	−2.16%
1997	762	−2.76%
2007	708	−0.73%
2012	630	−2.31%
2017	516	−3.91%
2022	433	−3.45%

Source: Population censuses (1935-1997) and TÜİK (2007-2022)

== Economy ==
The economy of a village depends on agriculture and husbandry. Due to the continental climate conditions in the region; Grain (Wheat, Barley, etc.) agriculture is common. Pumpkin is grown intensively on irrigated lands. Apart from these; Agricultural products such as beans, corn, vetch, alfalfa, chickpea, sunflower and oat are also grown. The presence of the pond in the south of the village ensures that the vineyards, orchards and alfalfa fields can be irrigated continuously. Although its economic value is not much; Vineyards and gardens are also cultivated. Grape, apple, apricot are other crops grown. small cattle breeding; It is done in large herds in fields and plateaus. One of the biggest economic inputs of the village is cattle breeding. Milk is collected regularly in the village; are sold to private companies.

== Transport ==
Village to Aksaray; With a 40 km road, 10 km of which is stabilized and 30 km of asphalt road, to Nevşehir; It is connected to Kırşehir by a road of total 50 km, 12 km of which is stabilized and 38 km of asphalt road, and 67 km of which is completely asphalt road. Çatin Village, which is connected to Ortaköy, which is the district center, by a 15 km asphalt road, does not encounter any difficulties regarding transportation.

== Gallery ==
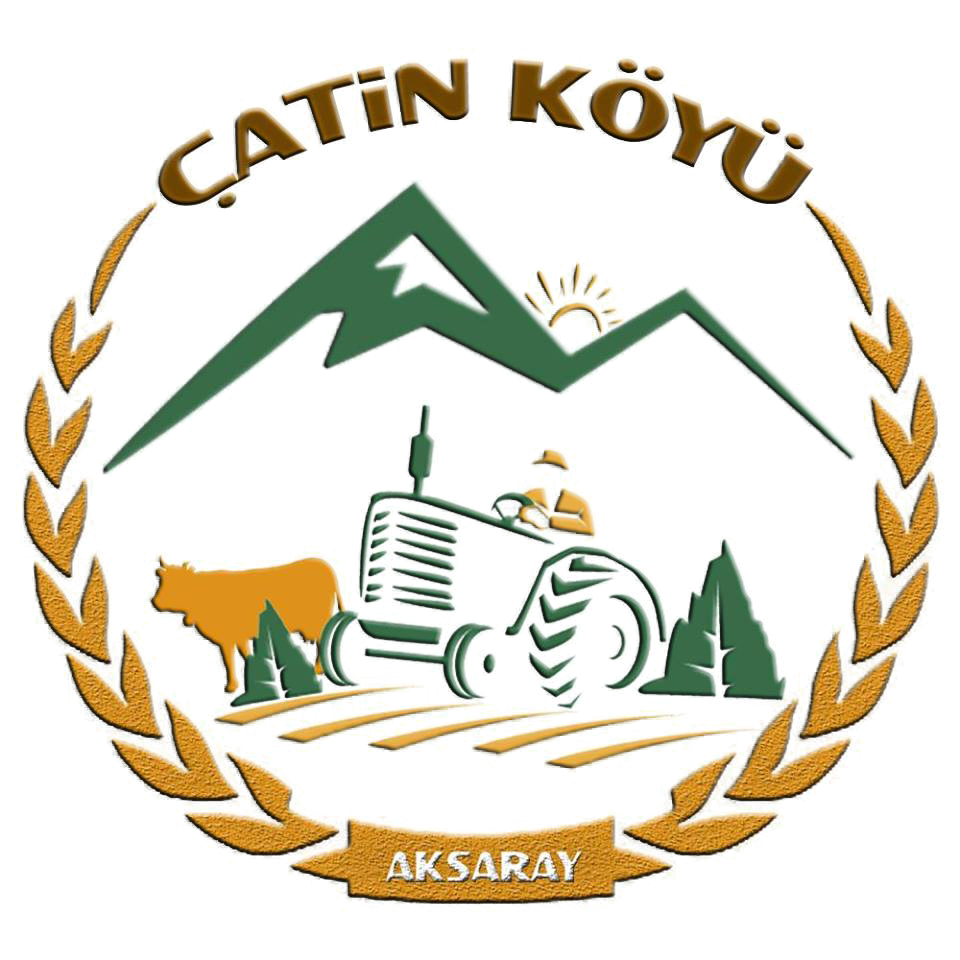

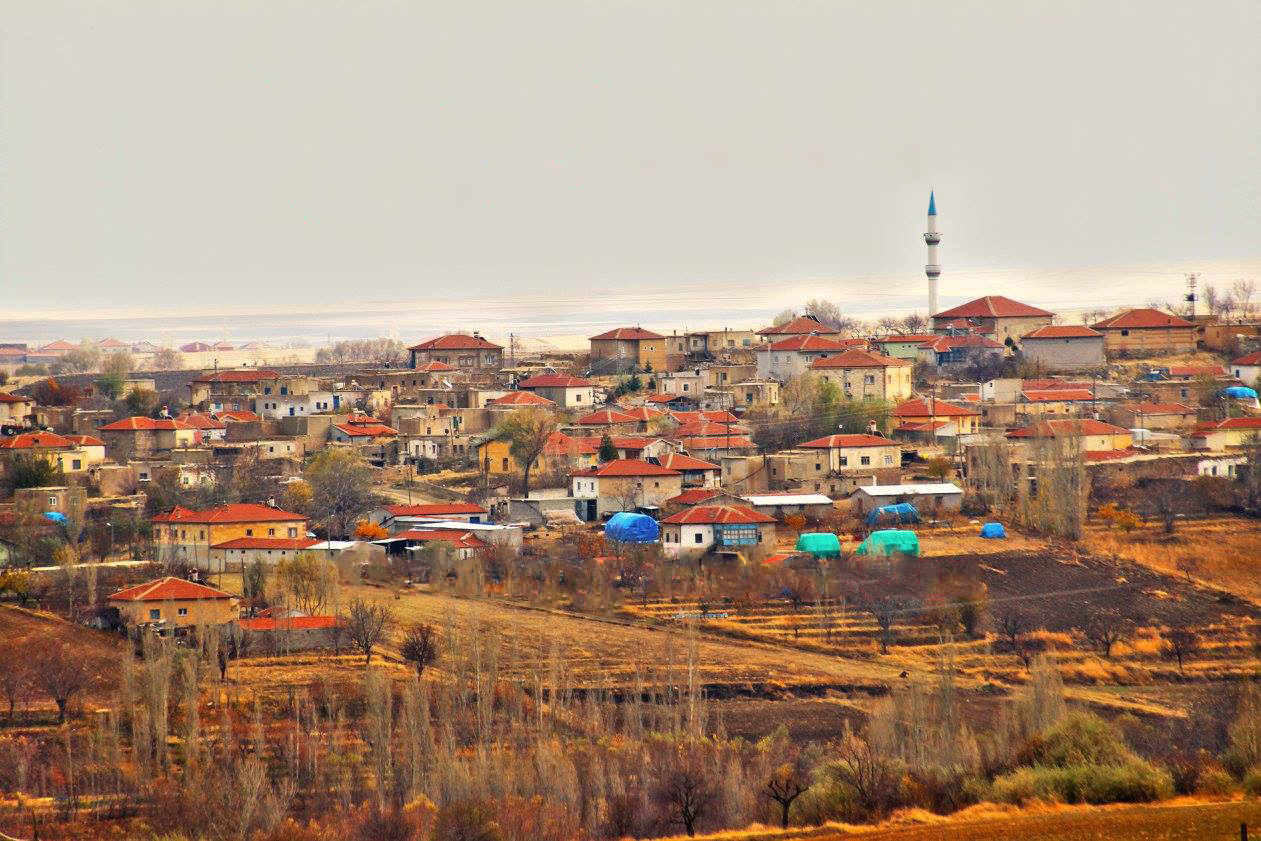

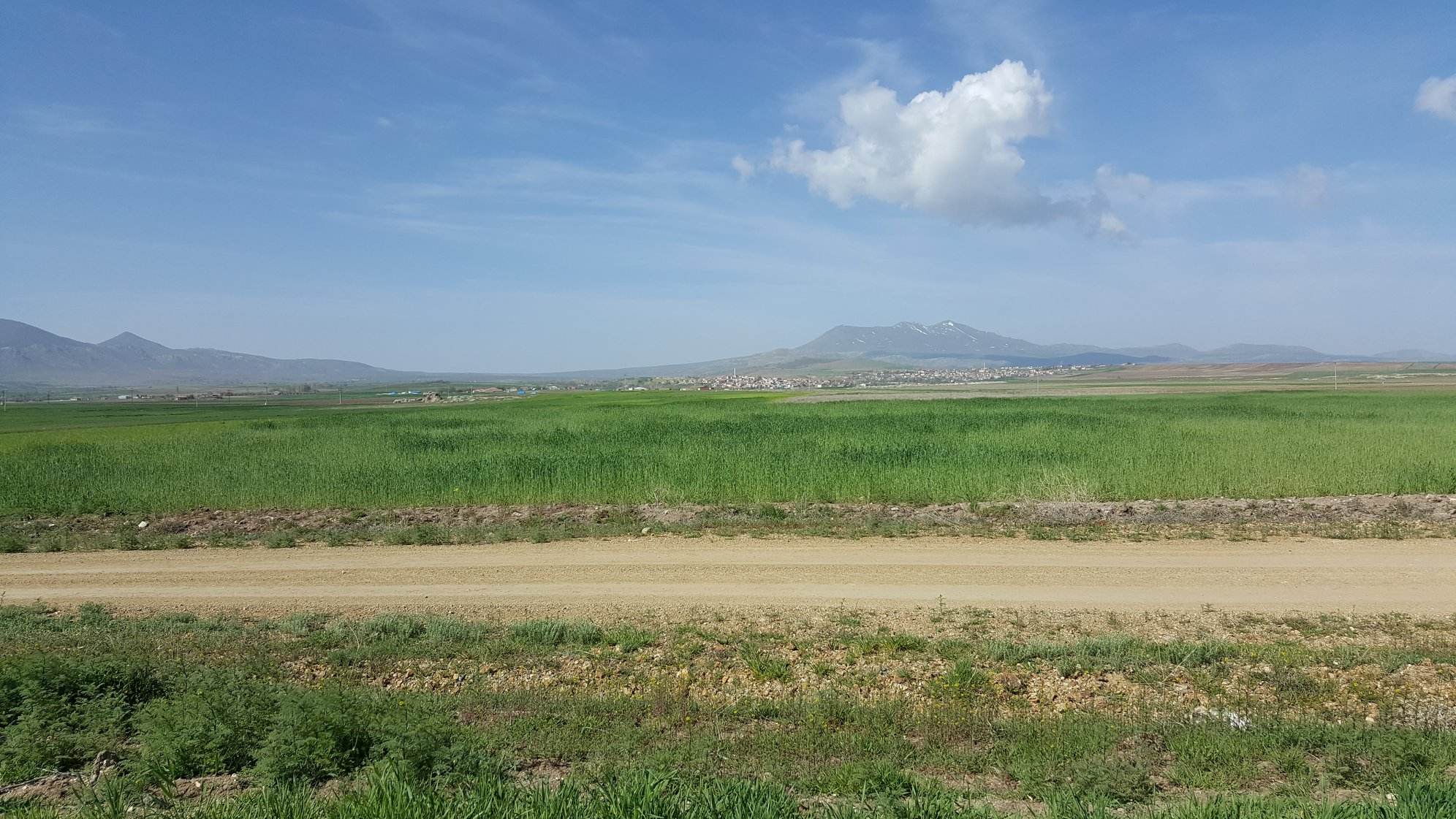

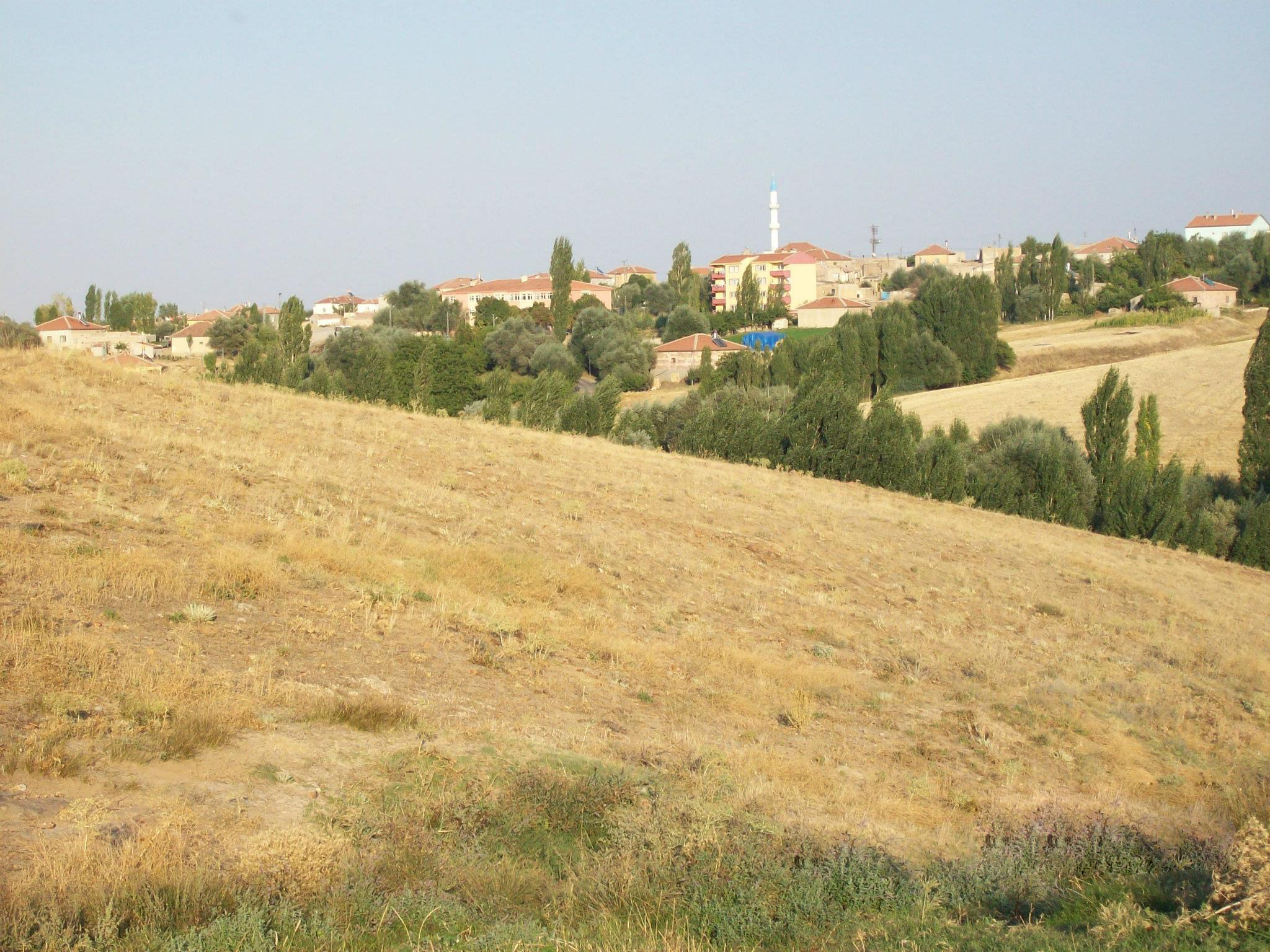

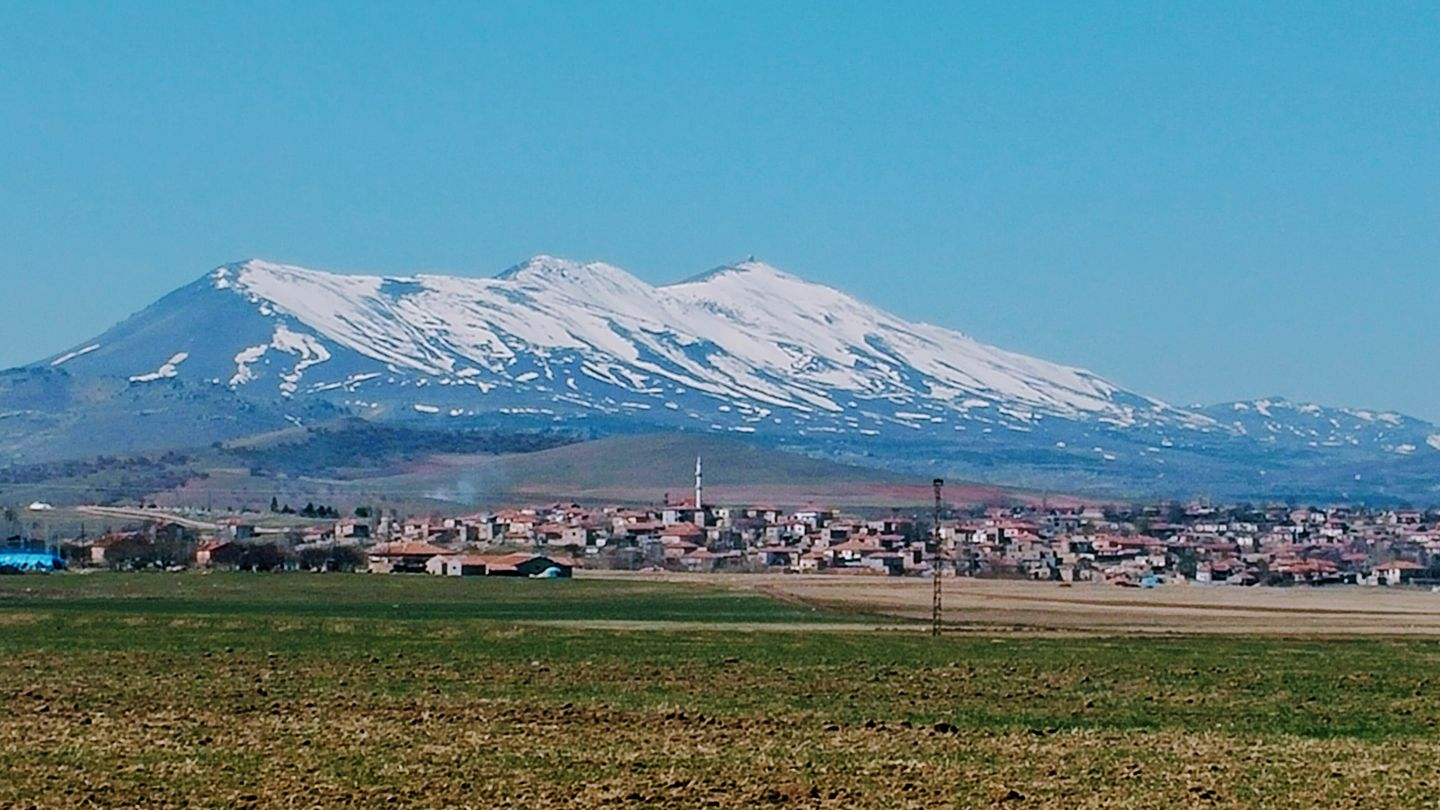

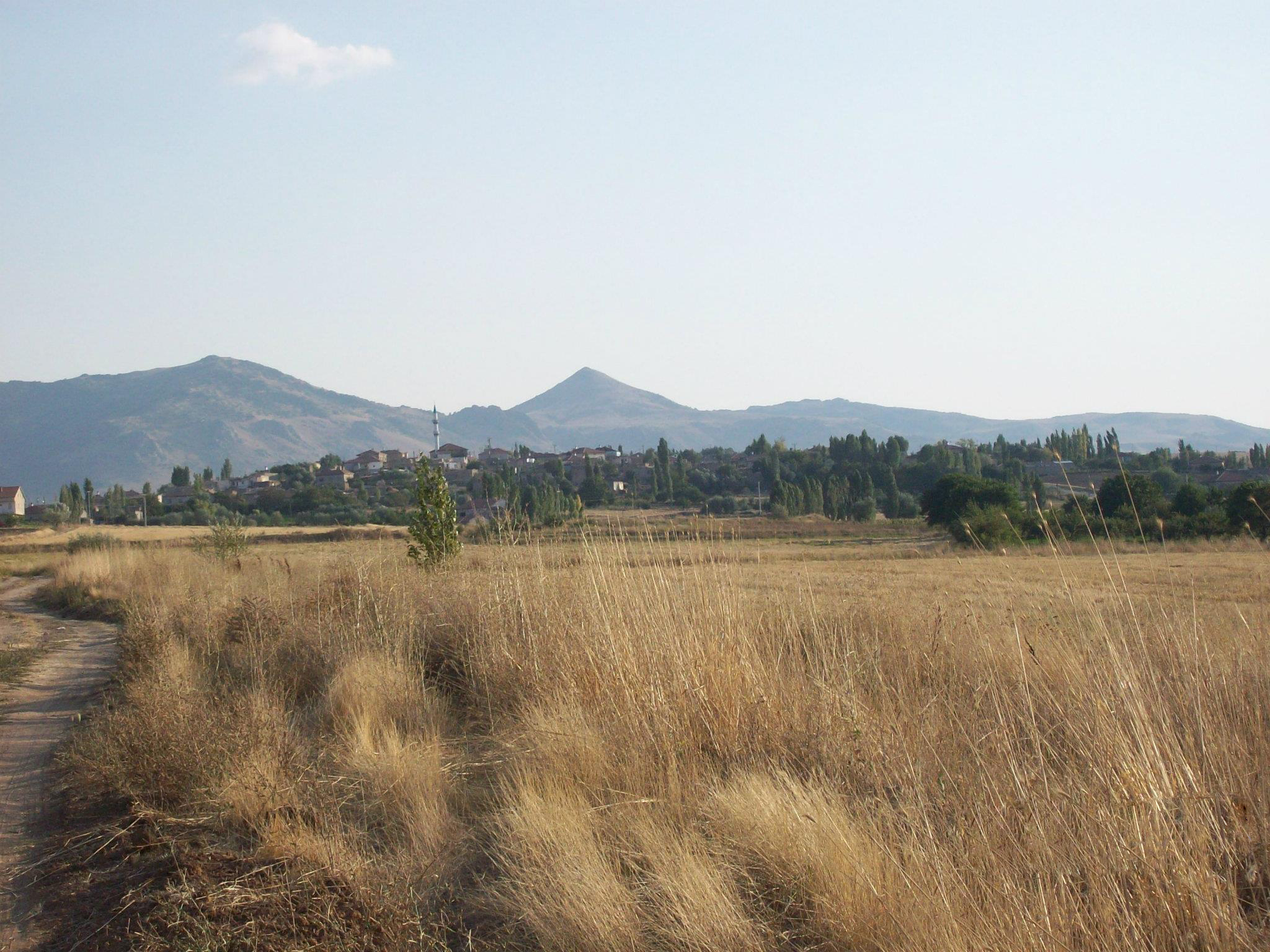

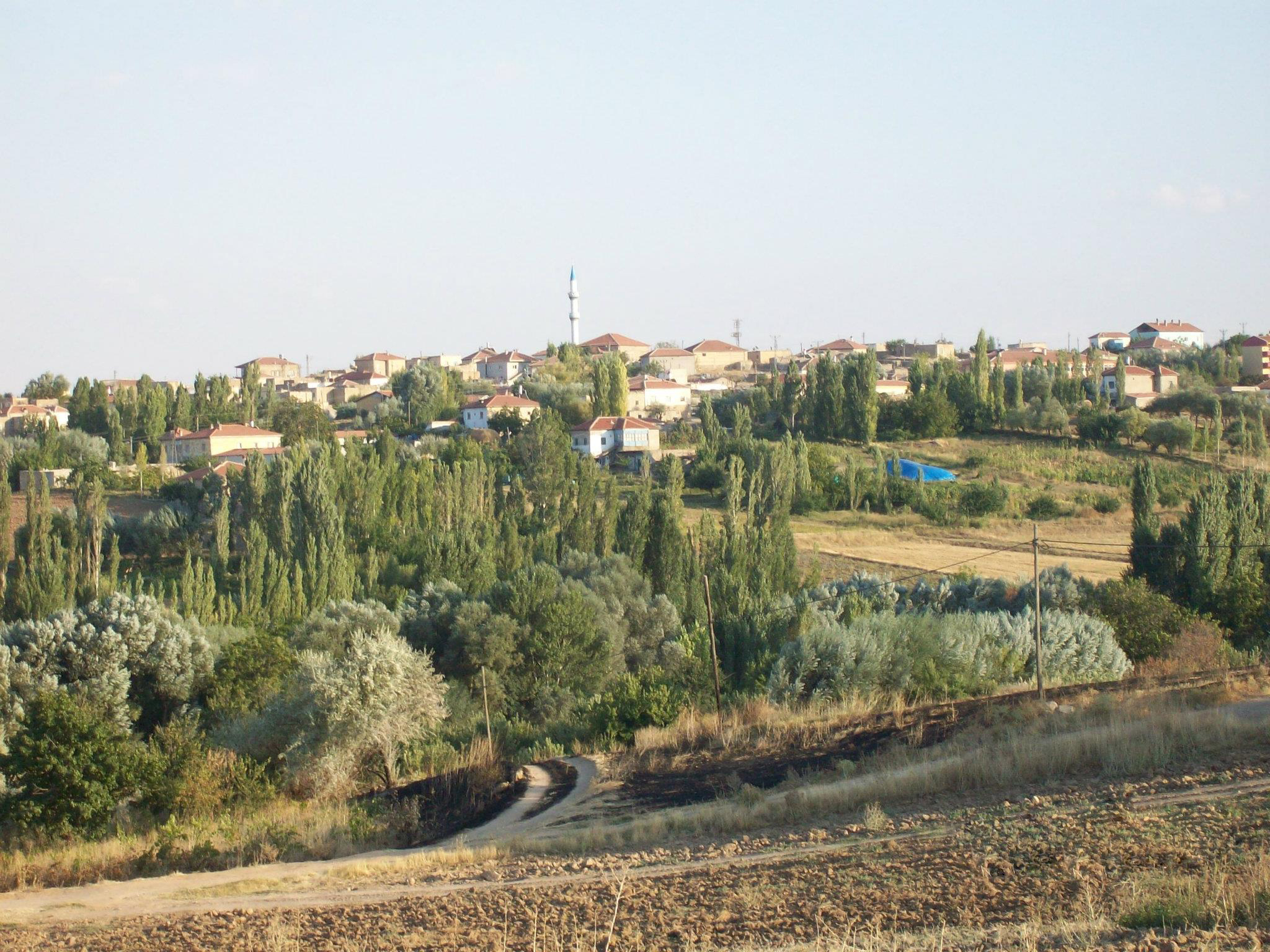

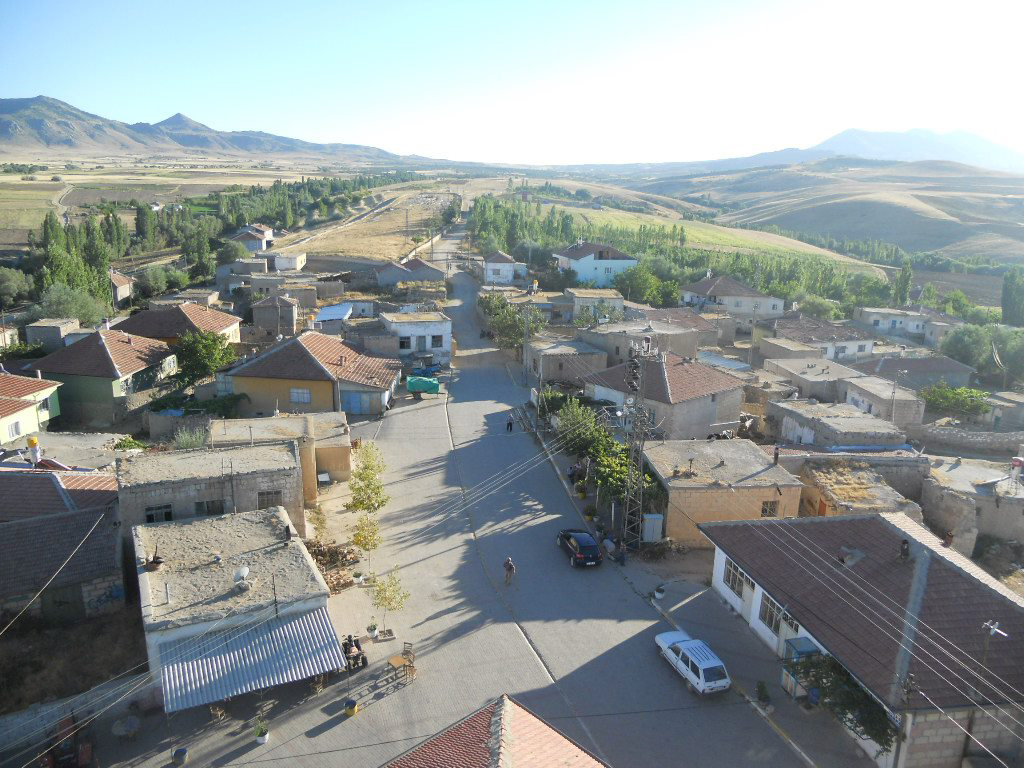

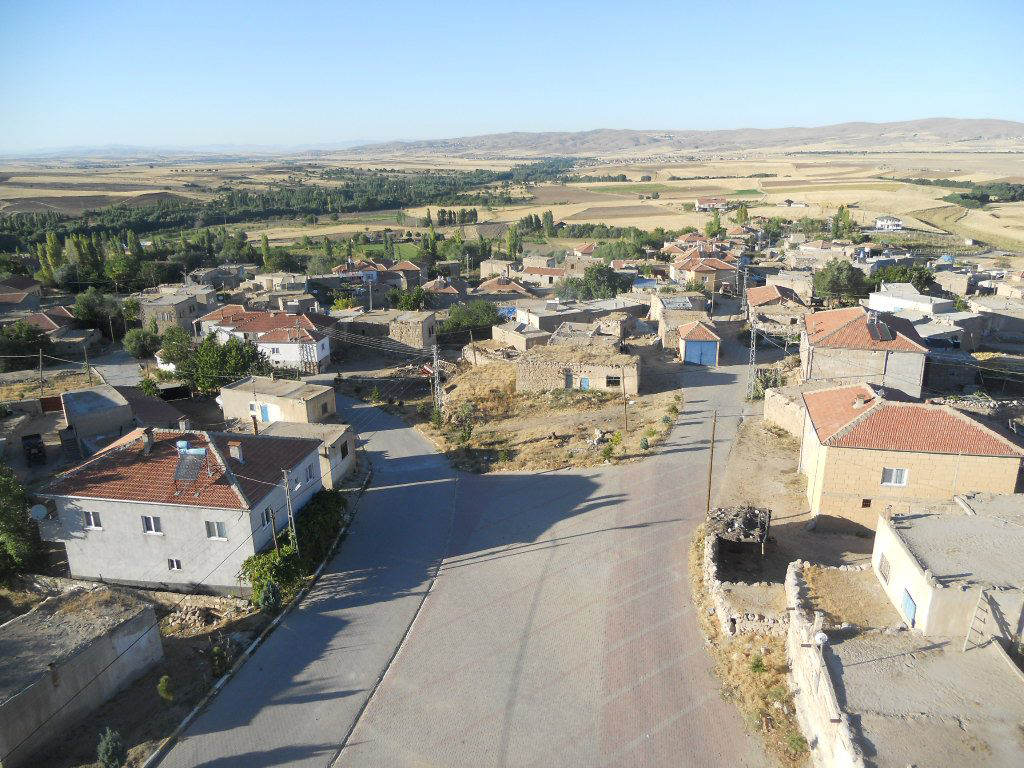

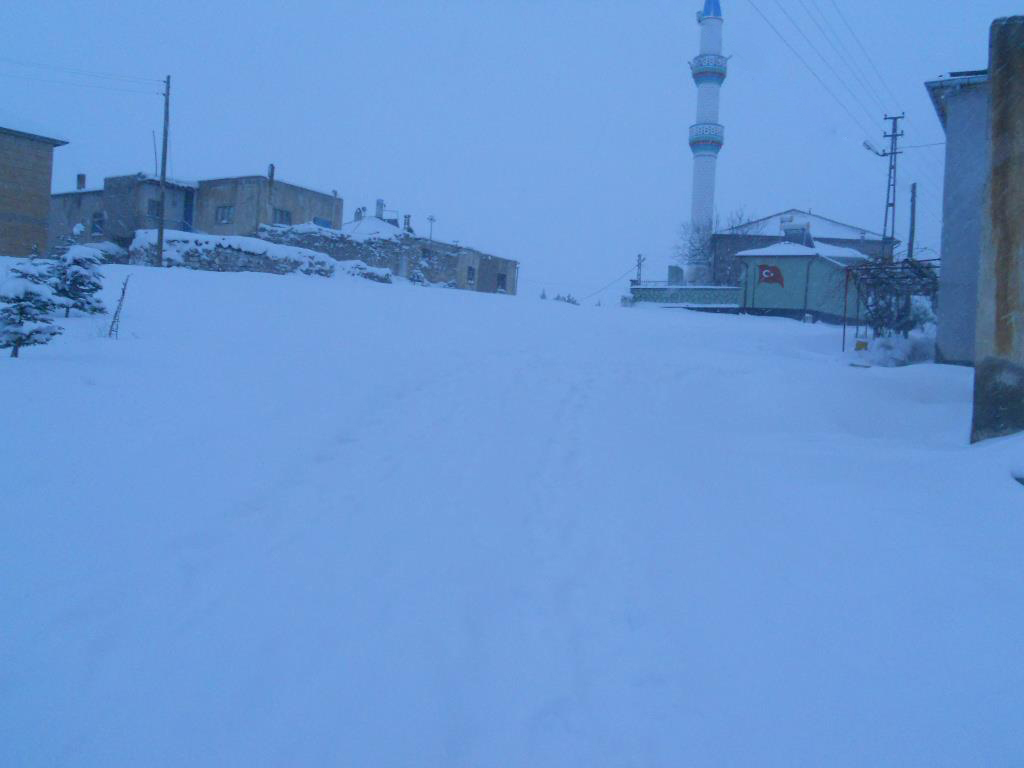
