= Nitazi =

Town of ancient Cappadocia

Coordinates: 38°42′34″N 33°54′45″E

Nitazi or Nitalis or Nitazo was a town of ancient Cappadocia, inhabited in Roman and Byzantine times. It was located on the road between Mocissus and Archelais. The name appears as Nitazi in the Antonine Itinerary, as Nitazo in the Tabula Peutingeriana, and as Nitalis in the Jerusalem Itinerary.

Its site is tentatively located near Pınarbaşı (formerly Kabakulak) in Ortaköy district of Aksaray province, Asiatic Turkey.
