= Balcı, Ortaköy =

Balcı
- Neighbourhood
- Location in Turkey Balcı (Turkey Central Anatolia)
- Coordinates: 38.7253°N 34.1012°E
- Country: Turkey
- Province: Aksaray
- District: Ortaköy
- Municipality: Ortaköy
- Population (2021): 1,071
- Time zone: UTC+3 (TRT)

Balcı is a neighbourhood of the town Ortaköy, Ortaköy District, Aksaray Province, Turkey. Its population is 1,071 (2021). Before the 2013 reorganisation, it was a town (belde).
