= Karapınar, Ortaköy =

Karapinar
- Village
- Location within Turkey Location within Turkey Central Anatolia
- Coordinates: 38°41′N 33°55′E
- Country: Turkey
- Province: Aksaray
- District: Ortaköy
- Population (2026-27): 120 (eski 2,009−565 kisi)
- Time zone: UTC+3 (TRT)

Karapınar is a village in the Ortaköy District, Aksaray Province, Turkey. As of 2021, its population is 100.
