= Namlıkışla, Ortaköy =

Namlıkışla
- Village
- Location within Turkey Location within Turkey Central Anatolia
- Coordinates: 38°46′N 33°59′E
- Country: Turkey
- Province: Aksaray
- District: Ortaköy
- Population (2021): 236
- Time zone: UTC+3 (TRT)

Namlıkışla is a village in the Ortaköy District, Aksaray Province, Turkey. Its population is 236 (2021).
