= Harmandalı, Ortaköy =

Harmandalı
- Village
- Location within Turkey Location within Turkey Central Anatolia
- Coordinates: 38°56′04″N 33°56′56″E
- Country: Turkey
- Province: Aksaray
- District: Ortaköy
- Population (2021): 1,078
- Time zone: UTC+3 (TRT)

Harmandalı is a village in the Ortaköy District, Aksaray Province, Turkey. Its population is 1,078 (2021). Before the 2013 reorganisation, it was a town (belde). It is the presumed location of Nyssa, an ancient city and former bishopric in Cappadocia, which remains a titular see in the Eastern Orthodox Church and Latin Catholic Church.
