= Camuzluk, Ortaköy =

Camuzluk
- Village
- Location within Turkey Location within Turkey Central Anatolia
- Coordinates: 38.6499°N 33.9316°E
- Country: Turkey
- Province: Aksaray
- District: Ortaköy
- Population (2021): 178
- Time zone: UTC+3 (TRT)

Camuzluk is a village in the Ortaköy District, Aksaray Province, Turkey. Its population is 178 (2021).
