= Hıdırlı, Ortaköy =

Hıdırlı
- Village
- Location within Turkey Location within Turkey Central Anatolia
- Coordinates: 38.6918°N 33.9492°E
- Country: Turkey
- Province: Aksaray
- District: Ortaköy
- Population (2021): 146
- Time zone: UTC+3 (TRT)

Hıdırlı is a village in the Ortaköy District, Aksaray Province, Turkey. Its population is 146 (2021).
