= Devedamı, Ortaköy =

Devedamı
- Village
- Location within Turkey Location within Turkey Central Anatolia
- Country: Turkey
- Province: Aksaray
- District: Ortaköy
- Population (2021): 578
- Time zone: UTC+3 (TRT)

Devedamı is a village in the Ortaköy District, Aksaray Province, Turkey. Its population is 578 (2021). Before the 2013 reorganisation, it was a town (belde).
