= Gökkaya, Ortaköy =

Gökkaya
- Village
- Location within Turkey Location within Turkey Central Anatolia
- Coordinates: 38.6498°N 33.9785°E
- Country: Turkey
- Province: Aksaray
- District: Ortaköy
- Population (2021): 953
- Time zone: UTC+3 (TRT)

Gökkaya is a village in the Ortaköy District, Aksaray Province, Turkey. Its population is 953 (2021). The village is populated by Kurds.
