= Satansarı, Ortaköy =

Satansarı
- Village
- Location within Turkey Location within Turkey Central Anatolia
- Coordinates: 38°47′N 34°16′E
- Country: Turkey
- Province: Aksaray
- District: Ortaköy
- Population (2021): 385
- Time zone: UTC+3 (TRT)

Satansarı is a village in the Ortaköy District, Aksaray Province, Turkey. Its population is 385 (2021).
