= Akpınar, Ortaköy =

Akpınar
- Village
- Location within Turkey Location within Turkey Central Anatolia
- Coordinates: 38.7592°N 34.0096°E
- Country: Turkey
- Province: Aksaray
- District: Ortaköy
- Population (2021): 488
- Time zone: UTC+3 (TRT)

Akpınar is a village in the Ortaköy District, Aksaray Province, Turkey. Its population is 488 (2021).
