= Reşadiye, Ortaköy =

Reşadiye
- Village
- Location within Turkey Location within Turkey Central Anatolia
- Country: Turkey
- Province: Aksaray
- District: Ortaköy
- Population (2021): 97
- Time zone: UTC+3 (TRT)

Reşadiye is a village in the Ortaköy District, Aksaray Province, Turkey. Its population is 97 (2021). The village is populated by Kurds.
