= Pirli, Ortaköy =

Pirli
- Village
- Location within Turkey Location within Turkey Central Anatolia
- Coordinates: 38.7292°N 34.1635°E
- Country: Turkey
- Province: Aksaray
- District: Ortaköy
- Population (2021): 62
- Time zone: UTC+3 (TRT)

Pirli is a village in the Ortaköy District, Aksaray Province, Turkey. Its population is 62 (2021).
