= Hacıibrahimuşağı =

- Village
- Location within Turkey Location within Turkey Central Anatolia
- Coordinates: 37.87209°N 36.82120°E
- Country: Turkey
- Province: Aksaray
- District: Ortaköy
- Population (2021): 280
- Time zone: UTC+3 (TRT)

Hacıibrahimuşağı is a village situated in the Ortaköy District, Aksaray Province, Turkey. Its population is 280 (2021).
