= Durhasanlı, Ortaköy =

Durhasanlı
- Village
- Location within Turkey Location within Turkey Central Anatolia
- Coordinates: 38°44′N 34°12′E
- Country: Turkey
- Province: Aksaray
- District: Ortaköy
- Population (2021): 214
- Time zone: UTC+3 (TRT)

Durhasanlı is a village in the Ortaköy District, Aksaray Province, Turkey. Its population is 214 (2021).
