= Bozkır, Ortaköy =

Bozkır
- Village
- Location within Turkey Location within Turkey Central Anatolia
- Coordinates: 38.7911°N 34.1229°E
- Country: Turkey
- Province: Aksaray
- District: Ortaköy
- Population (2021): 673
- Time zone: UTC+3 (TRT)

Bozkır is a village in the Ortaköy District, Aksaray Province, Turkey. Its population is 673 (2021). Before the 2013 reorganisation, it was a town (belde).
