= Salarıalaca, Ortaköy =

Salarıalaca
- Village
- Location within Turkey Location within Turkey Central Anatolia
- Country: Turkey
- Province: Aksaray
- District: Ortaköy
- Population (2021): 574
- Time zone: UTC+3 (TRT)

Salarıalaca is a village in the Ortaköy District, Aksaray Province, Turkey. Its population is 574 (2021).
