= Hocabeyli, Ortaköy =

Hocabeyli
- Village
- Location within Turkey Location within Turkey Central Anatolia
- Coordinates: 38°45′N 33°59′E
- Country: Turkey
- Province: Aksaray
- District: Ortaköy
- Population (2021): 200
- Time zone: UTC+3 (TRT)

View of Hocabeyli Village

Hocabeyli is a village in the Ortaköy District, Aksaray Province, Turkey. Its population is 200 (2021).
