= Hacımahmutuşağı =

- Village
- Location within Turkey Location within Turkey Central Anatolia
- Coordinates: 38°44′N 33°57′E
- Country: Turkey
- Province: Aksaray
- District: Ortaköy
- Population (2021): 170
- Time zone: UTC+3 (TRT)

Hacımahmutuşağı is a village in the Ortaköy District, Aksaray Province, Turkey. Its population is 170 (2021).
