= Seksenuşağı, Ortaköy =

Seksenuşağı
- Village
- Location within Turkey Location within Turkey Central Anatolia
- Coordinates: 38°42′N 34°00′E
- Country: Turkey
- Province: Aksaray
- District: Ortaköy
- Population (2021): 265
- Time zone: UTC+3 (TRT)

Seksenuşağı is a village in the Ortaköy District, Aksaray Province, Turkey. Its population is 265 (2021).
