= Sarıkaraman, Ortaköy =

Sarıkaraman
- Village
- Location within Turkey Location within Turkey Central Anatolia
- Coordinates: 38°46′N 34°12′E
- Country: Turkey
- Province: Aksaray
- District: Ortaköy
- Population (2021): 1,036
- Time zone: UTC+3 (TRT)

Sarıkaraman is a village in the Ortaköy District, Aksaray Province, Turkey. Its population is 1,036 (2021). Before the 2013 reorganisation, it was a town (belde).
