= Oğuzlar, Ortaköy =

Oğuzlar
- Village
- Location within Turkey Location within Turkey Central Anatolia
- Coordinates: 38.669°N 33.943°E
- Country: Turkey
- Province: Aksaray
- District: Ortaköy
- Population (2021): 112
- Time zone: UTC+3 (TRT)

Oğuzlar is a village in the Ortaköy District, Aksaray Province, Turkey. Its population is 112 (2021).
