= Ceceli, Ortaköy =

Ceceli
- Village
- Location within Turkey Location within Turkey Central Anatolia
- Country: Turkey
- Province: Aksaray
- District: Ortaköy
- Population (2021): 196
- Time zone: UTC+3 (TRT)

Ceceli is a village in the Ortaköy District, Aksaray Province, Turkey. Its population is 196 (2021).
