= Yıldırımlar, Ortaköy =

Yıldırımlar
- Village
- Location within Turkey Location within Turkey Central Anatolia
- Coordinates: 38°40′N 33°59′E
- Country: Turkey
- Province: Aksaray
- District: Ortaköy
- Population (2021): 231
- Time zone: UTC+3 (TRT)

Yıldırımlar is a village in the Ortaköy District, Aksaray Province, Turkey. Its population is 231 (2021).
