= Salarıgödeler, Ortaköy =

Salarıgödeler
- Village
- Location within Turkey Location within Turkey Central Anatolia
- Coordinates: 38°42′N 34°10′E
- Country: Turkey
- Province: Aksaray
- District: Ortaköy
- Population (2021): 64
- Time zone: UTC+3 (TRT)

Salarıgödeler is a village in the Ortaköy District, Aksaray Province, Turkey. Its population is 64 (2021).
