= Aksaray Malaklisi =

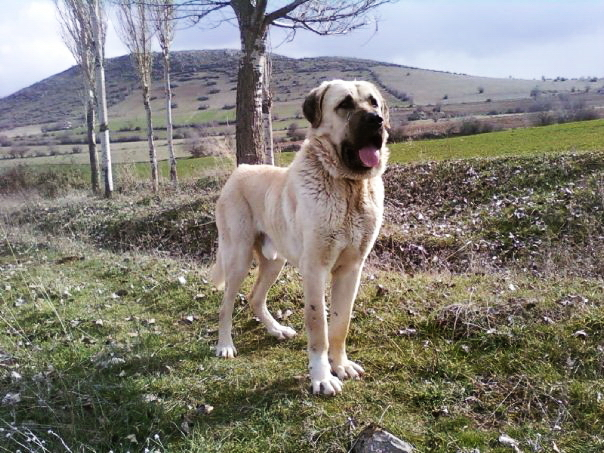
- Other names: Malaklı Karabaş; Turkish Mastiff; Anatolian Lion
- Origin: Turkey
Traits
Height	Males	75–85 cm (30–33 in)
	Females	70–80 cm (28–31 in)
Weight	Males	65–85 kg (145–185 lb)
	Females	60–70 kg (130–155 lb)
- Coat: short
- Colour: pinto, grizzly, and brindle
- Litter size: around 10
Kennel club standards
- Turkish Dog Federation: standard

The Aksaray Malaklısı or Malaklı Karabaş is a Turkish breed of large flock guardian dog from the Aksaray Province in central Anatolia. It is also known as the Turkish Mastiff or the Anatolian Lion.

It is recognized by the Turkish Dog Federation. Some have been exported to other countries, where they are used either in their traditional role as flock guardians, or are kept as household guard dogs.

== History ==
Aksaray in Turkey

The Aksaray Malaklısı is named for the Aksaray Province in Central Anatolia.

Genetic analysis has shown it to be a distinct breed from other Turkish livestock guardian dog breeds, including the Kangal, Akbash and Kars.

== Characteristics ==
The Aksaray Malaklısı usually stands between 70 and 85 centimetres (28 and 33 in) at the withers and weighs between 60 and 85 kilograms (130 and 185 lb), with a body length of some 79 and 83 centimetres (31 and 33 in). It is usually grey in colour with a black mask; the coat is short. The head and ears are large, the jowls are pendulous, and the tail is straight. The "malakli" part of the breed name is said to be due to their pendulous jowls.

The dogs only obey commands from the master, and can be aggressive with other people. They typically do not tolerate working with other dogs of the same sex.

Their lifespan is 13–15 years.

== Use ==
The Aksaray Malaklısı is used in its homeland to protect flocks of sheep from predators, especially wolves. A pair of the dogs – always a dog and a bitch – can protect some 700-800 sheep.

Some have been exported to other countries, where they are used either in their traditional rôle as flock guardians, or are kept as household guard dogs.
