= Ozancık, Ortaköy =

Ozancık
- Village
- Location within Turkey Location within Turkey Central Anatolia
- Coordinates: 38.6680°N 34.2012°E
- Country: Turkey
- Province: Aksaray
- District: Ortaköy
- Population (2021): 812
- Time zone: UTC+3 (TRT)

Ozancık is a village in the Ortaköy District, Aksaray Province, Turkey. Its population is 812 (2021). Before the 2013 reorganisation, it was a town (belde).
