= Kümbet, Ortaköy =

Kümbet
- Village
- Location within Turkey Location within Turkey Central Anatolia
- Coordinates: 38.7112°N 34.1947°E
- Country: Turkey
- Province: Aksaray
- District: Ortaköy
- Population (2021): 712
- Time zone: UTC+3 (TRT)

Kümbet is a village in the Ortaköy District, Aksaray Province, Turkey. Its population is 712 (2021).
