= Pınarbaşı, Ortaköy =

Pınarbaşı
- Village
- Location within Turkey Location within Turkey Central Anatolia
- Country: Turkey
- Province: Aksaray
- District: Ortaköy
- Population (2021): 177
- Time zone: UTC+3 (TRT)

Pınarbaşı is a village in the Ortaköy District, Aksaray Province, Turkey. Its population is 177 (2021).
