= Cumali, Ortaköy =

Cumali
- Village
- Location within Turkey Location within Turkey Central Anatolia
- Coordinates: 38.6806°N 34.1702°E
- Country: Turkey
- Province: Aksaray
- District: Ortaköy
- Population (2021): 287
- Time zone: UTC+3 (TRT)

Cumali is a village in the Ortaköy District, Aksaray Province, Turkey. Its population is 287 (2021).
