= Ortaköy District, Aksaray =

District of Aksaray Province, Turkey

Ortaköy District
- District
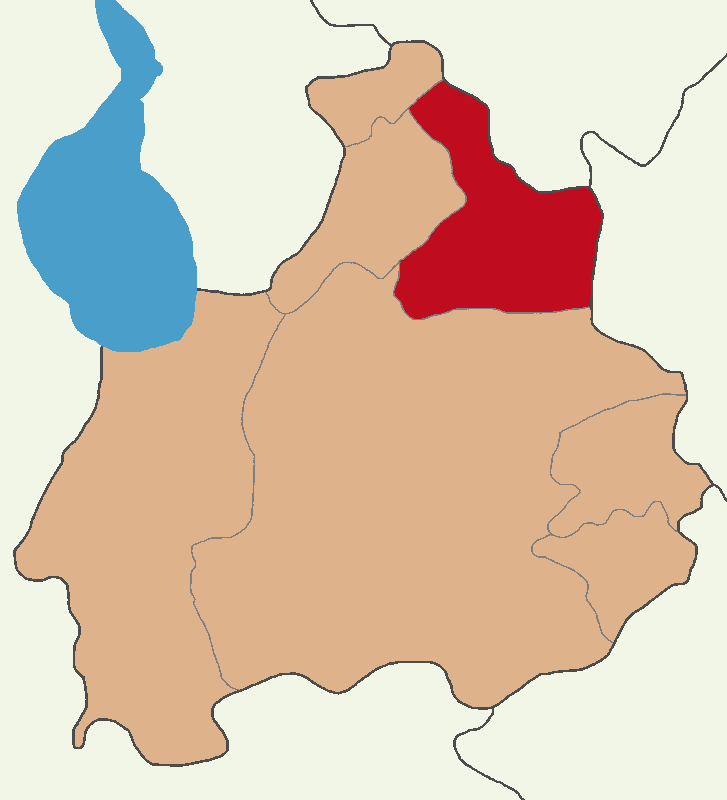
- Map showing Ortaköy District in Aksaray Province

- Location within Turkey Location within Turkey Central Anatolia
- Coordinates: 38°44′N 34°02′E
- Country: Turkey
- Province: Aksaray
- Seat: Ortaköy

Government
  - Kaymakam: Ahmet Karatepe
- Area: 727 km^{2} (281 sq mi)
- Population (2025): 31,089
  - Density: 42.8/km^{2} (111/sq mi)
- Time zone: UTC+3 (TRT)
- Website: www.ortakoy.gov.tr

Ortaköy District is a district of Aksaray Province of Turkey. Spread over an area of 727 km^{2} (281 sq mi), it is the third largest district by area in the province. It had a population of 31,089 in 2025. The district consists of municipality of Ortaköy and 30 villages.

== History ==
Ortakoy was historically known as Eyüp ili, a settlement established by Turkmen people. It came under the Ottoman Empire in 1470, when Ishak Pasha brought the Aksaray region under the Ottoman control. In the 15th century, the people of Ortaköy supported Bayezid II, when Cem Sultan laid a rebel claim to the throne. The district also played a role in the Turkish War of Independence. It was part of Karaman Province earlier.

== Geography ==
Ortakoy District is a district of Aksaray Province, located in the Central Anatolia region of Turkey. It is spread over an area of 727 km^{2} (281 sq mi), and is the third largest district by area in the province. It is located at an average altitude of 1,210 m (3,970 ft), to the north of Aksaray, along Mount Ekecik.

=== Administrative divisions ===
The district consists of the municipality of Ortaköy, and 30 villages.

- Akpınar
- Bozkır
- Camuzluk
- Çatin
- Ceceli
- Çiftevi
- Cumali
- Devedamı
- Durhasanlı
- Gökkaya
- Gökler
- Hacıibrahimuşağı
- Hacımahmutuşağı
- Harmandalı
- Hıdırlı
- Hocabeyli
- Karapınar
- Kümbet
- Namlıkışla
- Oğuzlar
- Ozancık
- Pınarbaşı
- Pirli
- Reşadiye
- Salarıalaca
- Salarıgödeler
- Sarıkaraman
- Satansarı
- Seksenuşağı
- Yıldırımlar

== Demographics and economy ==
According to 2025 population statistics published by the Turkish Statistical Institute, Ortakoy District had a population of 31,089 inhabitants, including 15,311 males and 15,778 females. It is the second most populous district in Aksaray Province, after Aksaray District, accounting for approximately 7% of the provincial population. Its population declined by approximately 3.8% between 2020 and 2025, due to migration of people, who reside in difficult geographies to urban areas and other provinces.

Of the total area, approximately 56,212.2 hectares (138,903 acres) was designated as agricultural land in 2025. Cereals, pulses, and beet are the major crops, apart from animal husbandry nd trade, which contribute to the economy.
