= Ortaköy, Aksaray =

Ortaköy
- Municipality
- Logo

- Location within Turkey Location within Turkey Central Anatolia
- Coordinates: 38°44′10″N 34°02′25″E
- Country: Turkey
- Province: Aksaray
- District: Ortaköy

Government
  - Mayor: Ahmet Koyuncu (AKP)
- Elevation: 1,140 m (3,740 ft)
- Population (2021): 20,511
- Time zone: UTC+3 (TRT)
- Area code: 0382
- Website: ortakoy.bel.tr

Ortaköy is a town in Aksaray Province in the Central Anatolia region of Turkey, located north of the city of Aksaray. It is the seat of Ortaköy District. Its population is 20,511 (2021). Its average elevation is 1,140 m (3,740 ft). The town consists of 12 quarters, including Balcı.

== History ==
=== Prehistoric ===
In Ortaköy and its surroundings, no comprehensive historical and archaeological research has been carried out on pre- and post-historical periods. It is claimed that some existing documents were destroyed by treasure hunters. Documents obtained during the excavations in Aksaray and the surrounding provinces (Acemhöyük, Alişar, Boğazköy) have also revealed the history of the region and its surroundings dating back to the Early Bronze Age. Archaeological excavations and researches to be carried out in settlements with more than one cultural level, such as Kalehöyük, Koçhasan Mound and Muratlı Höyük around Ortaköy, will yield new documents for the Hittite period. BC after the Hittites. Ortaköy is located in the region dominated by the Phrygians in the 7th century. Among the "burial" methods seen in Phrygian culture, "Rock Graves" made by carving are not encountered due to the geological structure of the regions. On the other hand, Tumuli where the Phrygian nobles were buried are frequently encountered. During the Asian expedition of the Macedonian King Alexander the Great,the Macedonians dominated.

=== Roman period ===
Upon the death of Alexander the Great in 323, the Kingdom of Cappadocia, founded by Arırarat, a Persian descendant, dominated the region. Kingdom of Cappadocia BC. It joined the Roman Empire in the 17th century. Aksaray was founded by the King of Cappadocia, Arkhelais. The city was named Archelais after the king, and for a while it was the capital city of the Cappadocia Kingdom. Small and large settlements from these periods, goddesses made of marble, coins in agricultural activities and illegal excavations are frequently encountered in the lands of Ishaklı, Karapınar, Sarıkaraman, Namlıkışla villages. In the first years of Christianity, this religion spread rapidly in the Cappadocia region. The rulers banned Christianity. Especially during the reign of Emperor Diocletian (284–305), this prohibition became much more rigid. It was almost like a massacre. Christian people have established underground cities in order to get rid of this brutality and to worship more freely. One of these galleries seen in Cappadocia is "Ersele" near Çatin Village and Ozancık Village.

=== Byzantine period ===
With the division of the Roman Empire into two in 395, Byzantine domination began in the Cappadocia region. There are coins, terracotta pots, drinking water networks, mortared dwelling remains, graves and various mining enterprises from this period in Ortaköy and its surroundings. These artifacts are frequently encountered in villages and towns such as Ozancık (Ersele), Sarıkaraman, Harmandalı and Gökkaya. Ortakoy and its surroundings, 7th century. From the very beginning, it was invaded by Sassanids and then by Arabs frequently. In order to resist and protect these invasions, the strategic points and derbents in the south were carefully preserved by the Byzantines, passages were kept close to Ereğli (Heraklia), Niğde, Aksaray (Arkhelais) and Ortaköy, and new castles were built.

It is possible that the “Küçük Sımandı Castle” in Ortaköy, west of Ekecik Mountains, belongs to this period. Melik Ahmet Danişmend Gazi, one of the commanders of the Great Seljuk state, who entered Anatolia with the Battle of Manzikert in 1071, conquered Aksaray and its surroundings and turned these places into a Turkish homeland. After being the capital of Anatolian Seljuk (1116), Kılıçarslan II, who tried to ensure the Anatolian Turkish Union, founded Aksaray on the ruins of Arkhelais. The Turkmen tribes brought from Azerbaijan were allowed to settle in the surrounding villages. They engaged in animal husbandry in the nomadic areas. Horses began to be bred in the meadows. During the Danishmend and Anatolian Seljuk period, the Turks who came to Anatolia from the east and drove the Byzantines there. The Turkmen tribes established a new settlement both on the Byzantine dwellings and on the pastures. One of them is the province of “Eyüp”. Ortaköy It was built on the ruins of the village.

=== Selçuk period ===
The tomb of the great Turkish mystic Yunus Emre, who worked for the unity of the state in the last years of the Anatolian Seljuk State, is on the Ziyaret Hill near the town of Sarıkaraman in Ortaköy. (1243) As a result of the defeat of Kösedağ and the settlement of the Mongols in Anatolia, the authority of the Anatolian Seljuk rulers was weakened. Due to the state authority vacuum that occurred as a result of this, Ortaköy and its surroundings also changed hands between Eretna, Kadı Burhaneddin and Karamanoğulları.

=== Ottoman period ===
In 1470, when Ishak Pasha took Şereflikoçhisar and its surroundings under Ottoman rule, Ortaköy and its surroundings also came under Ottoman rule. In 1477, the population of Aksaray and its surroundings was written, cadastral registers were kept, and their estates and foundations were determined. In this period, Aksaray was a sanjak center of Karaman Province. In addition to Hasandağı, Bekir, Eyübeli, Sahra, Ova, Eyyup sub-districts, Şereflikoçhisar was also connected to Aksaray as a sub-district. The people of Ortaköy, like the people of Aksaray, took the side of Sultan Beyazıd in the Cem Sultan rebellion during the reign of Beyazid II.

=== Turkish Republic ===
The people of Ortaköy were on the side of the Turkish side during the War of Independence.

== Places of interest ==
- Yunus Emre Türbesi - a tomb 25 km from the town, one of the many places in Turkey that claims to be the final resting place of the legendary folk-poet Yunus Emre.
