= Aksaray Province =

Coordinates: 38°25′51″N 33°51′44″E

Aksaray Province Aksaray ili
- Province
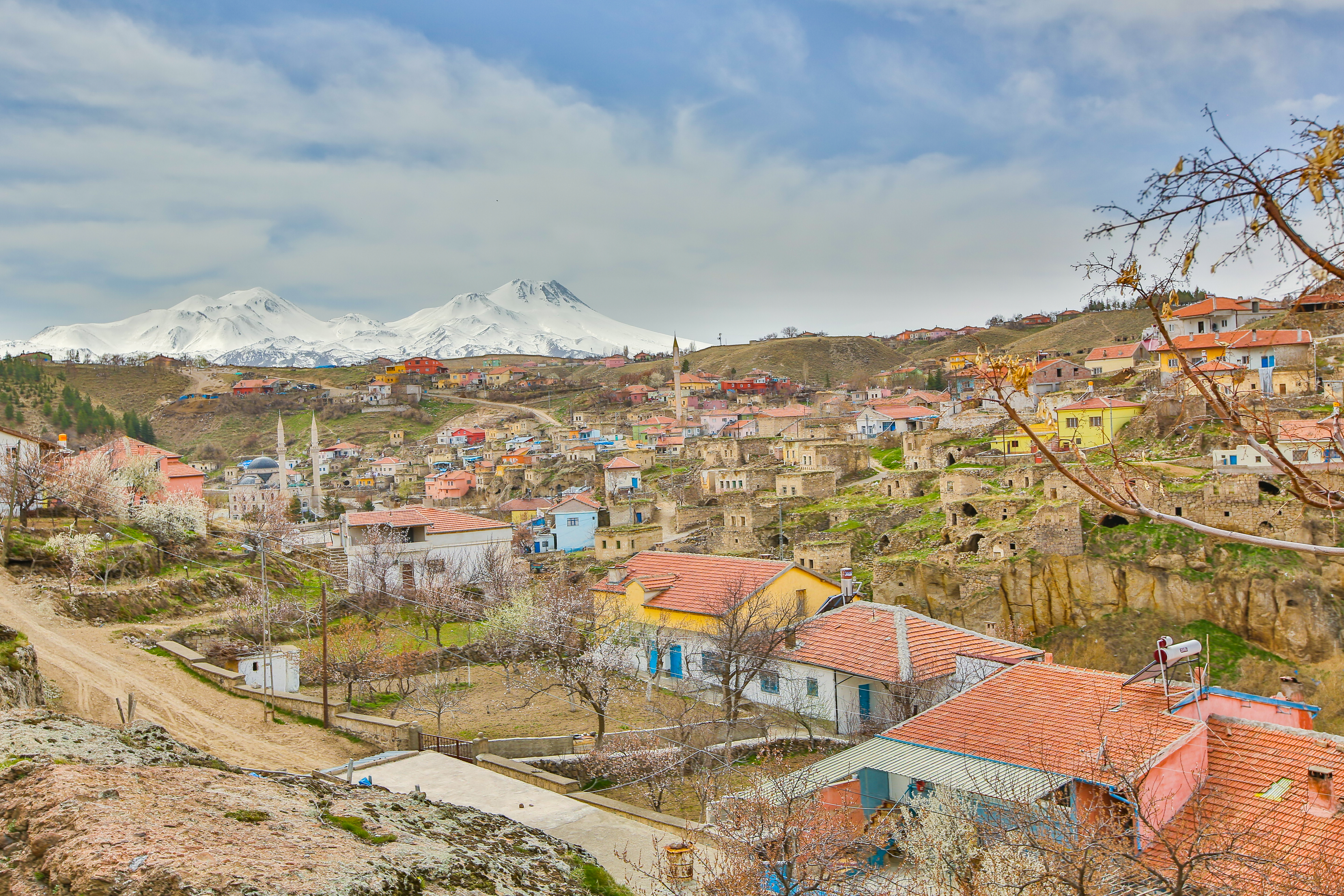

- Location of the province within Turkey
- Country: Turkey
- Seat: Aksaray

Government
  - Governor: Murat Duru
- Area: 7,659 km^{2} (2,957 sq mi)
- Population (2024): 439.474
  - Density: 0.05738/km^{2} (0.1486/sq mi)
- Time zone: UTC+3 (TRT)
- Area code: 0382
- Website: www.aksaray.gov.tr

Aksaray Province (Turkish: Aksaray ili) is a province in central Turkey. Its adjacent provinces are Konya along the west and south, Ankara to the northwest, Niğde to the southeast, Nevşehir to the east, and Kırşehir to the north. Its area is 7,659 km^{2}, and its population is 439.474 (2022). The provincial capital is the city of Aksaray.

Aksaray is one of the four provinces in Cappadocia, along with Nevşehir, Niğde, and Kayseri. Also, the 3,000-metre (9,843 ft) volcano Mount Hasan stands between Aksaray and Niğde. Summers are hot and dry on the plain, but the area is green and covered in flowers in springtime, when water streams off the mountainside. The 2,400 m2 salt lake (0.59 acres), Tuz Gölü, lies within the boundaries of Aksaray, a large swamp area with a maximum depth of 1 metre (3 ft 3 in).

== Districts ==
Aksaray province is divided into 8 districts (capital district in bold):

- Ağaçören
- **Aksaray**
- Eskil
- Gülağaç
- Güzelyurt
- Ortaköy
- Sarıyahşi
- Sultanhanı

== Etymology ==
In antiquity the area was named Archelais Garsaura, which was mutated to Taksara during the Seljuk Turkish era, and then to Aksaray. Aksaray means "White Palace" in Turkish.

== Population ==
Historical population
Year	Pop.	±% p.a.
1927	127,031	—
1990	326,399	+1.51%
2000	396,084	+1.95%
2010	377,505	−0.48%
2020	423,011	+1.14%
Source:Turkstat

== History ==
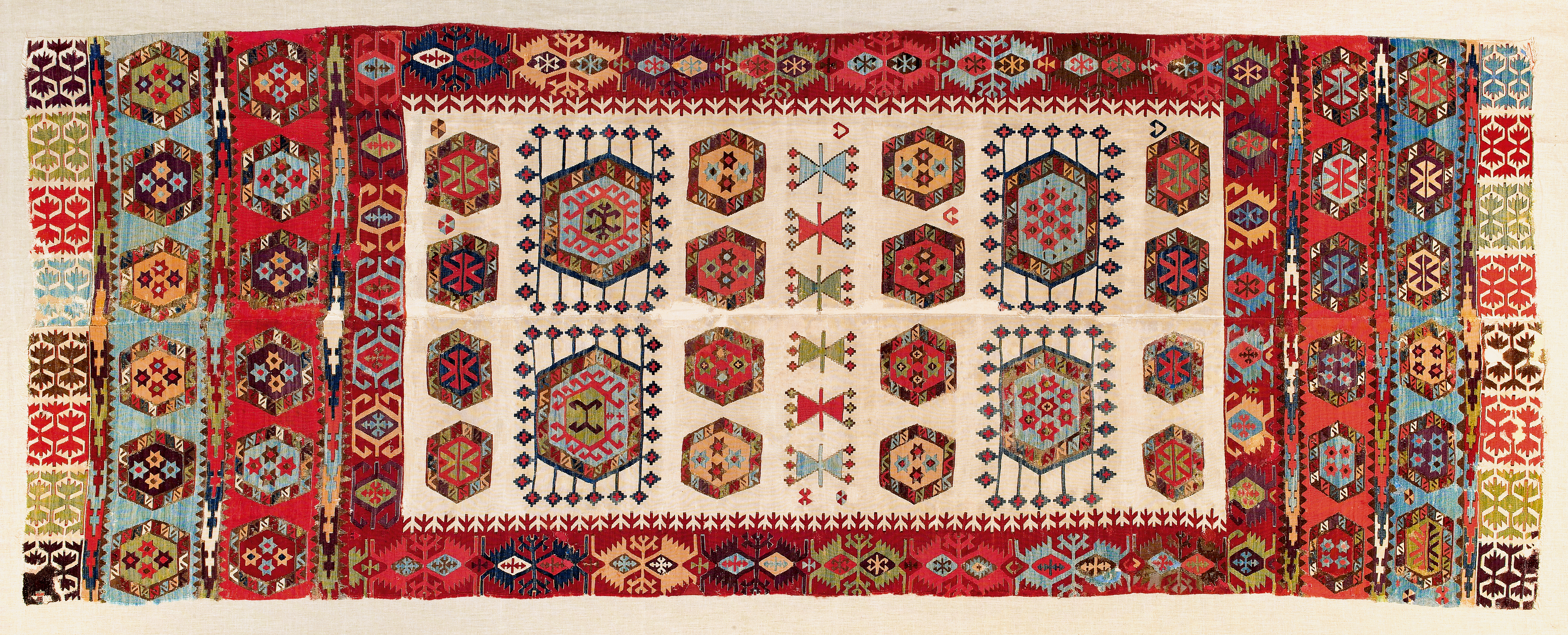
Aksaray Kilim, 18th century. The kilim was probably made by a group of settled Hotamis Turkmen in the Aksaray region. It may have been used for a funeral, and was later donated to the local mosque.

The plains of central Anatolia have been settled for 8,000 years, and the area around Aksaray bears monuments to a string of civilisations that have settled on the plain in that time. The mound of Aşıklı Höyük in the town of Kızılkaya indicates a settlement dating back to 5,000BC (and also a skull of a woman who had apparently been trepanned, the earliest known record of brain surgery).

Later the Silk Road came through here so caravanserai and then larger and larger settlements were built to supply and shelter travellers and traders. The city and surroundings of Aksaray thrived in the Roman, Byzantine and the Turkish periods.

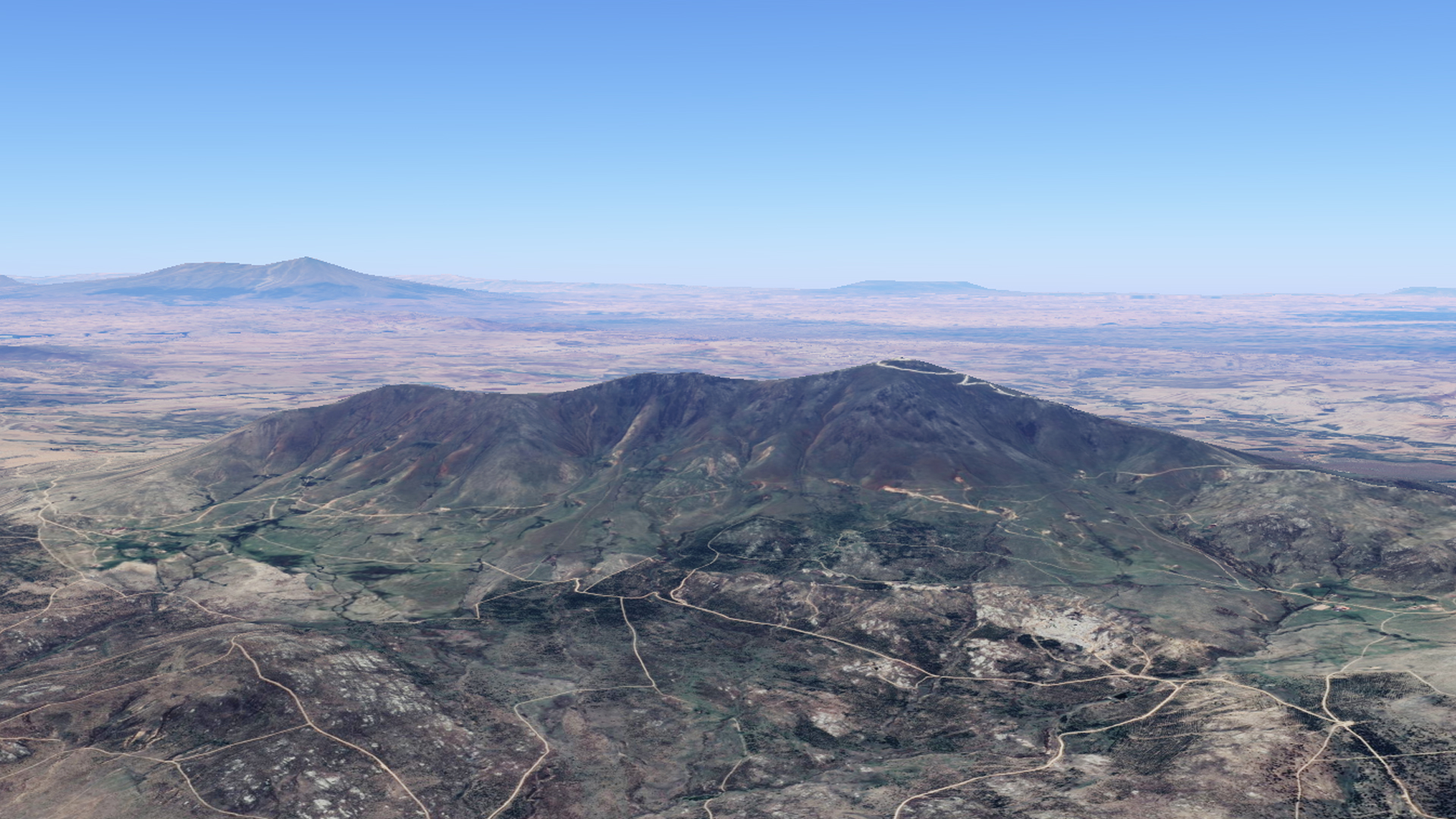
Ekecik Mountain - View from the northern slope.

Today Aksaray is a rural, agricultural province, its people religious and conservative. Since the 1950s, many have moved to Europe as migrant workers. The population of Aksaray has long included a higher proportion of Kurdish people than most central Anatolian provinces. Many were resettled here from Tunceli, Diyarbakir, Adiyaman. and other eastern cities following the Sheikh Said rebellion in the 1920s.

== See also ==
- List of populated places in Aksaray Province
- Aksaray Malaklisi
- Lake Tuz Natural Gas Storage

== Gallery ==
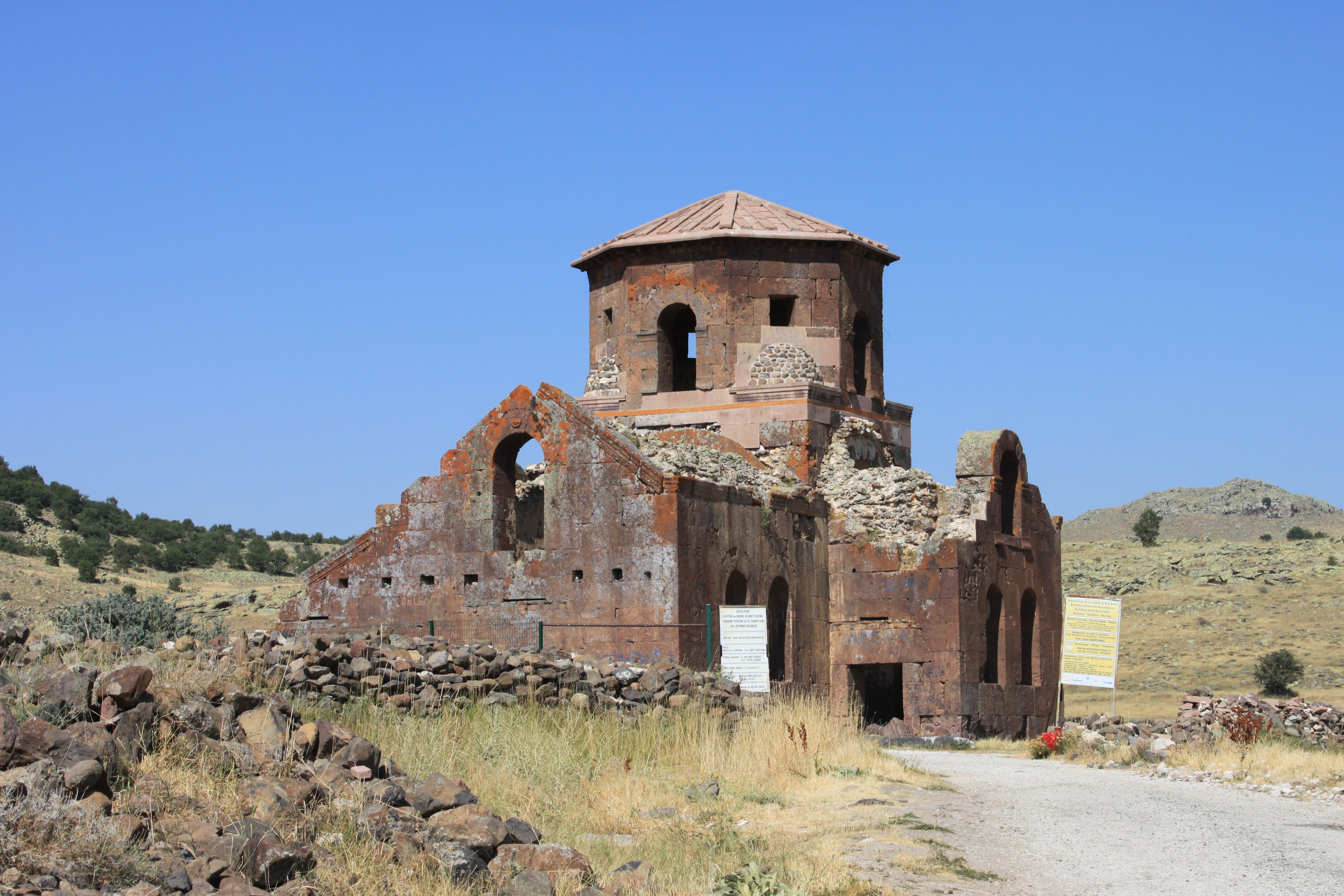
Kısıl Kilise, meaning “Red Church” in Güzelyurt.

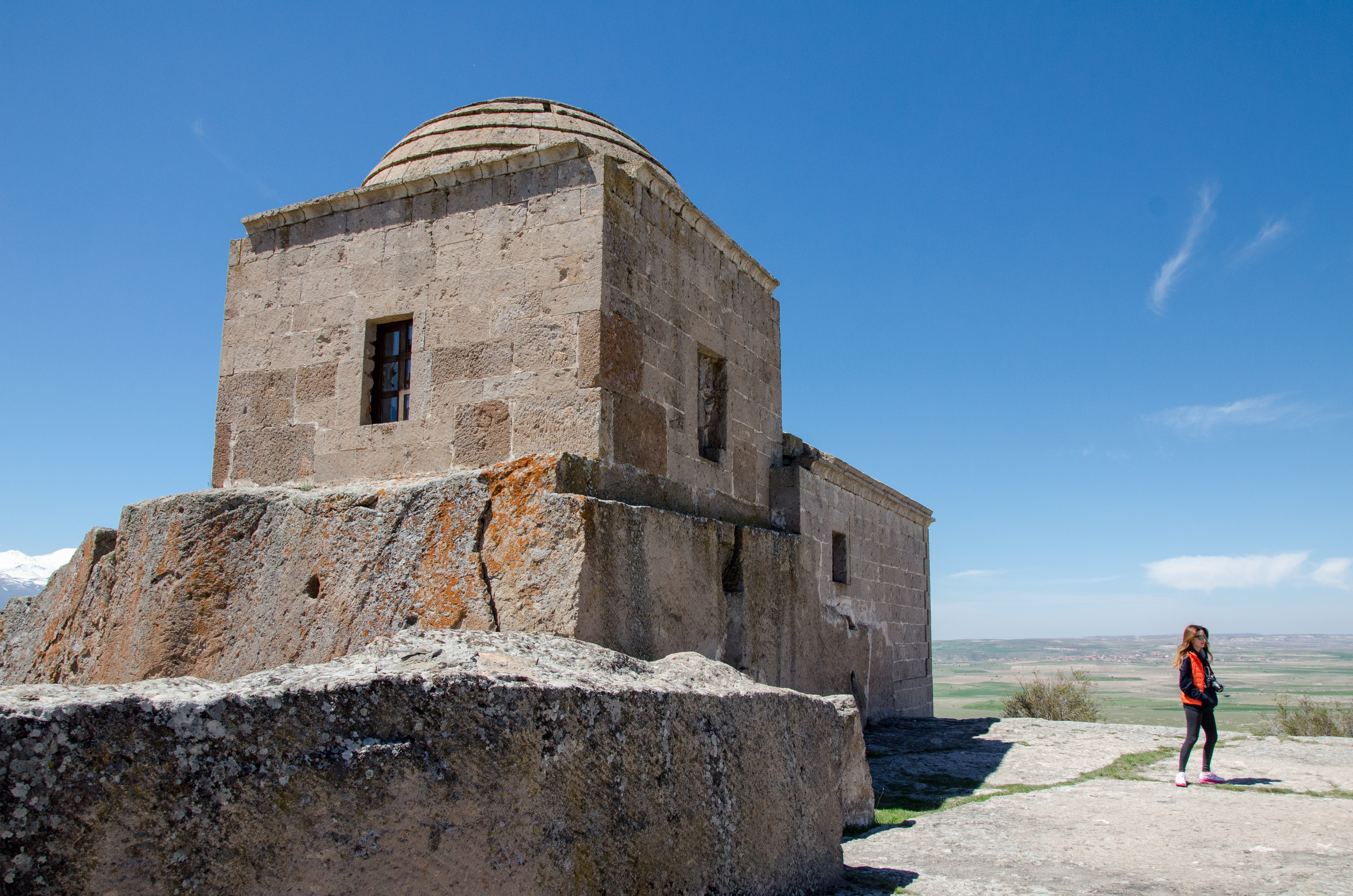
St. Analipsis Church, also known as the "High Church".

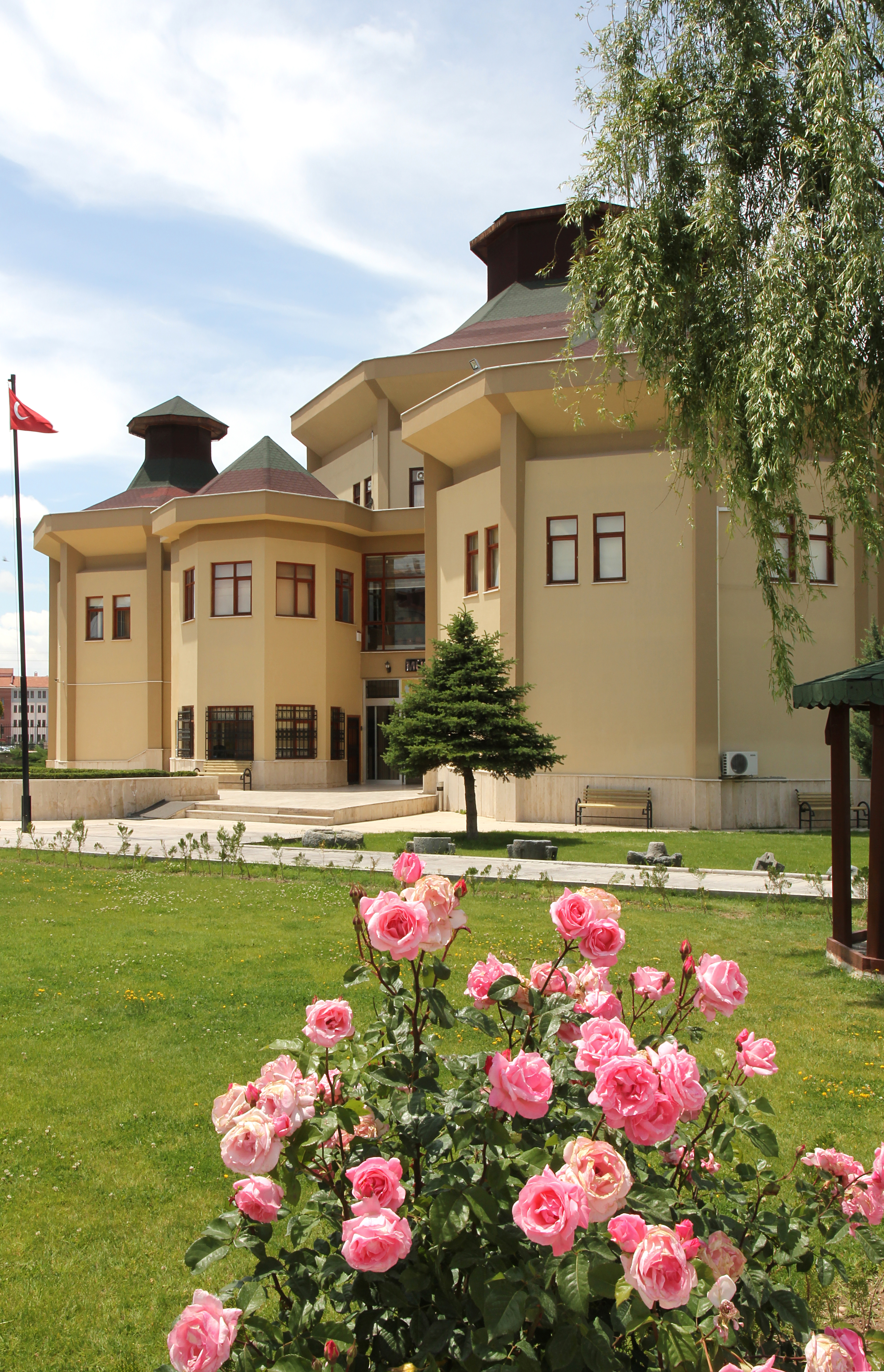
Aksaray Museum.

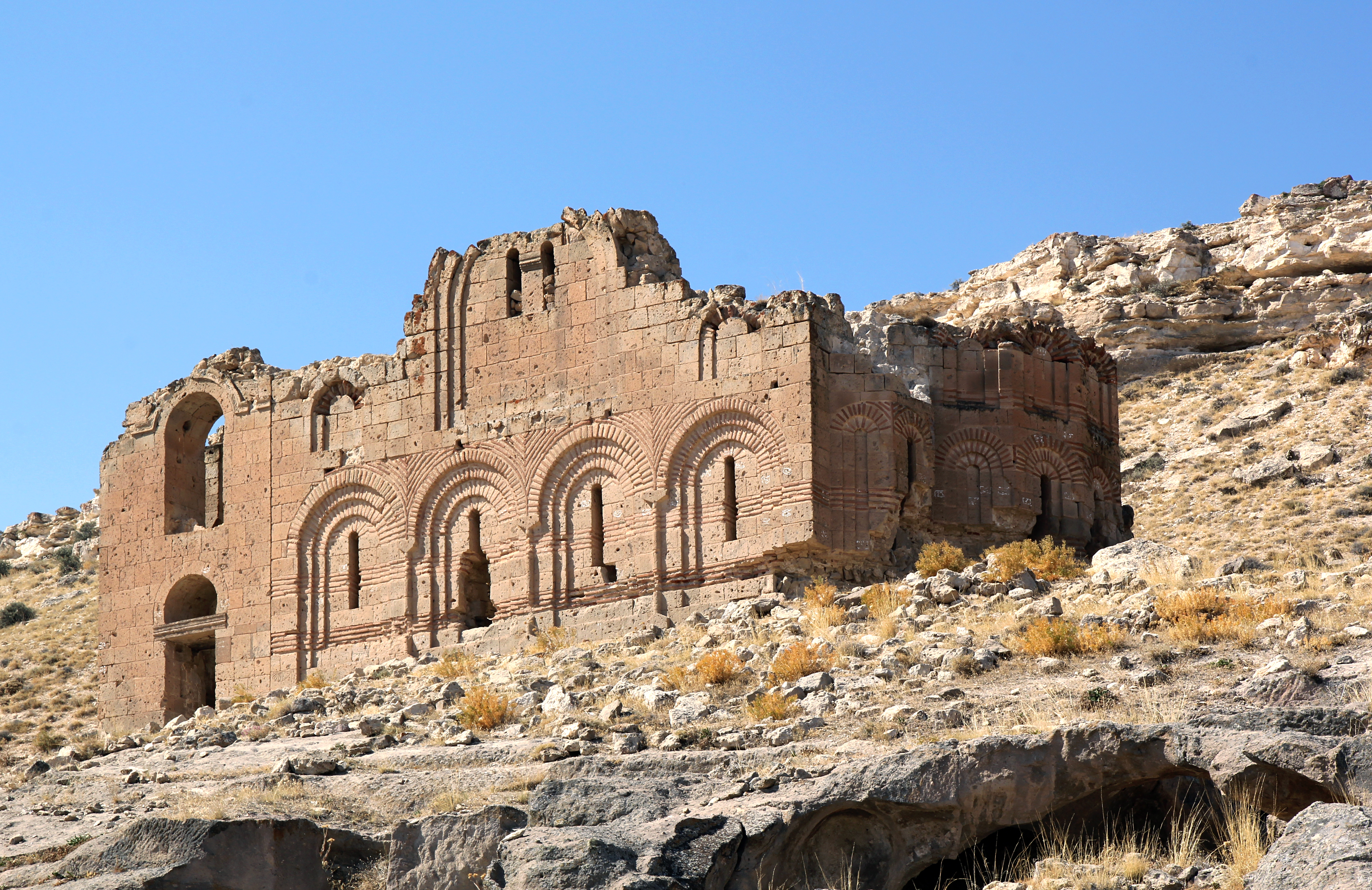
Çanlı Kilise, meaning 'Bell Church' southwest of Aksaray city.

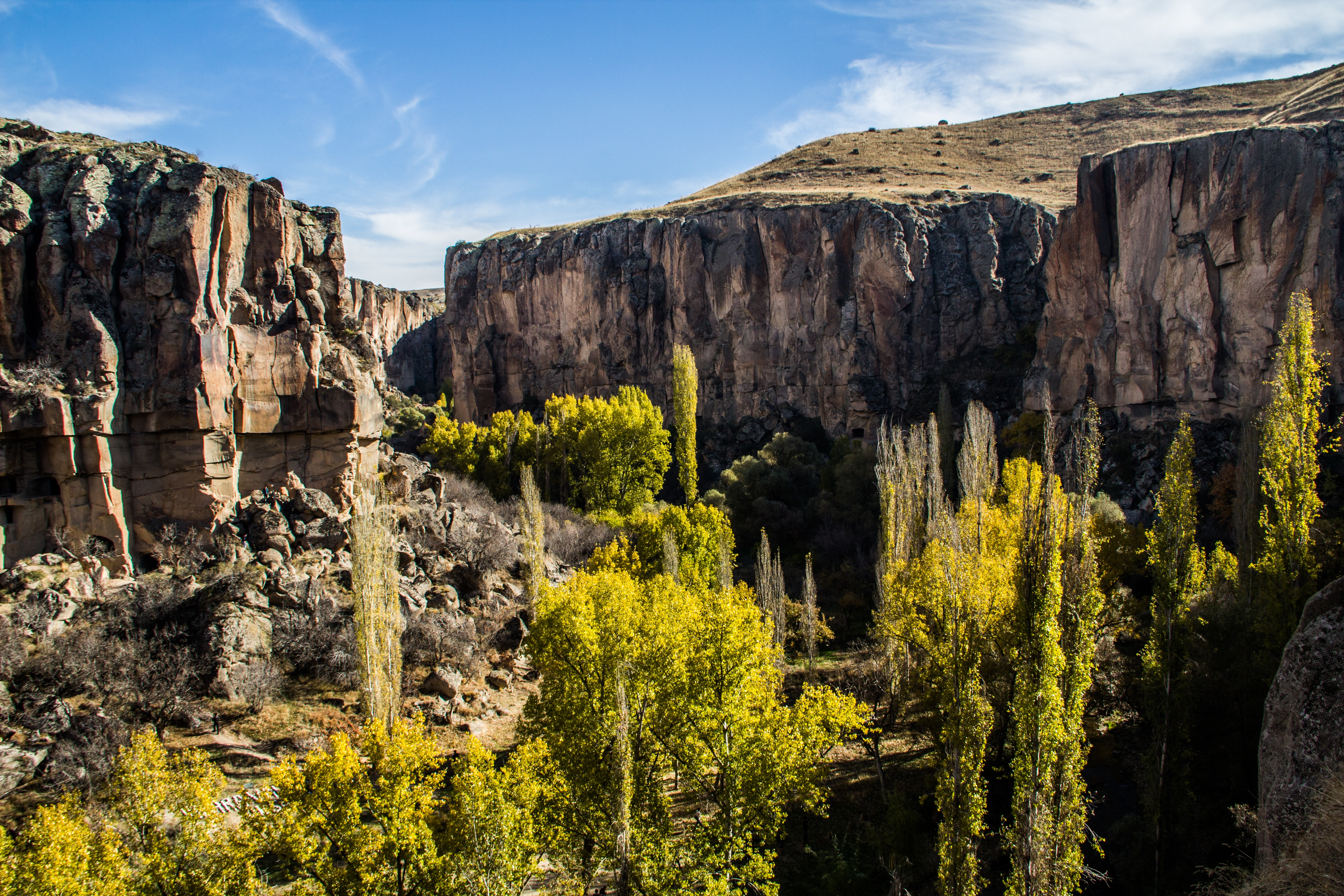
A view of Ihlara valley, Aksaray

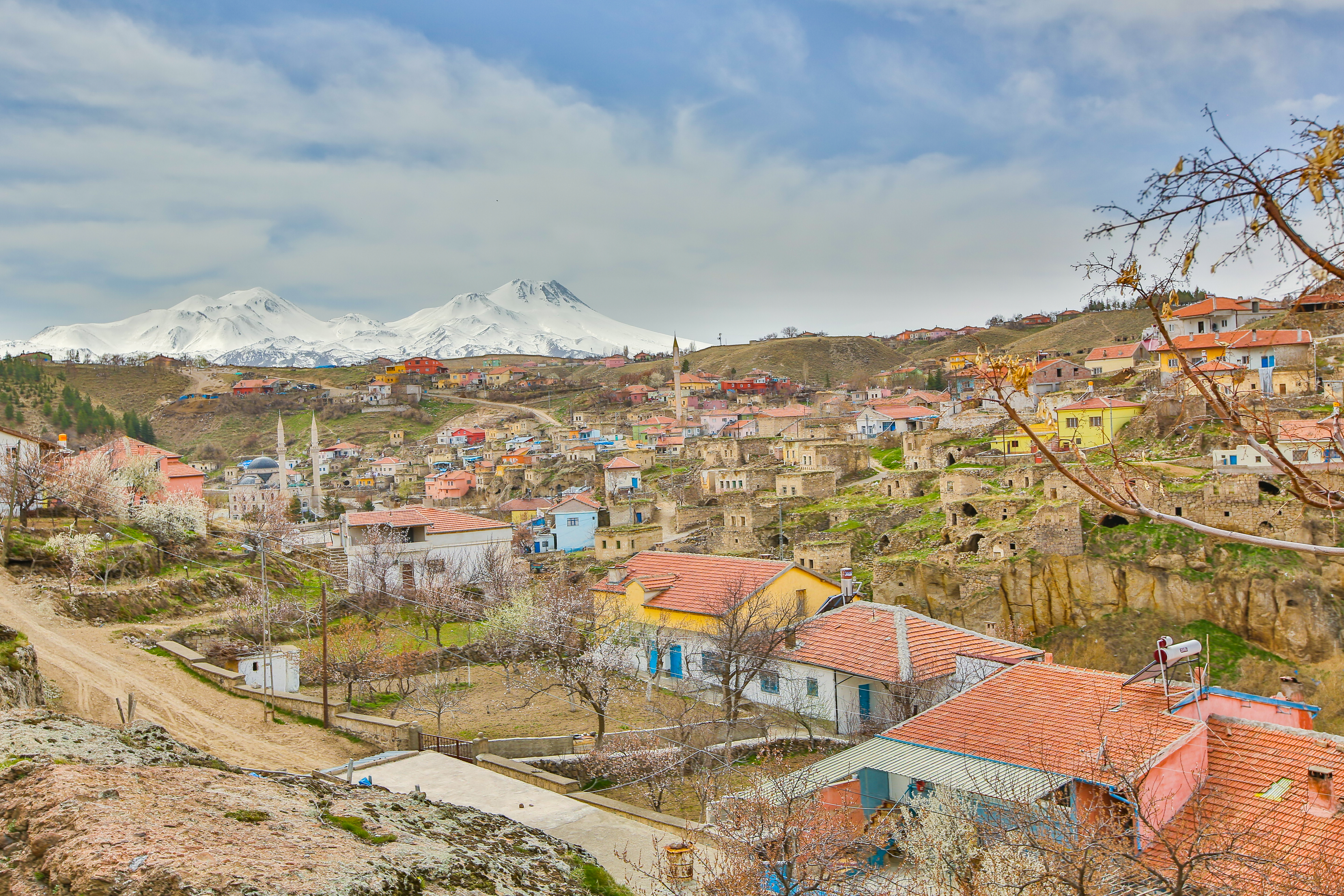
View of Ihlara town

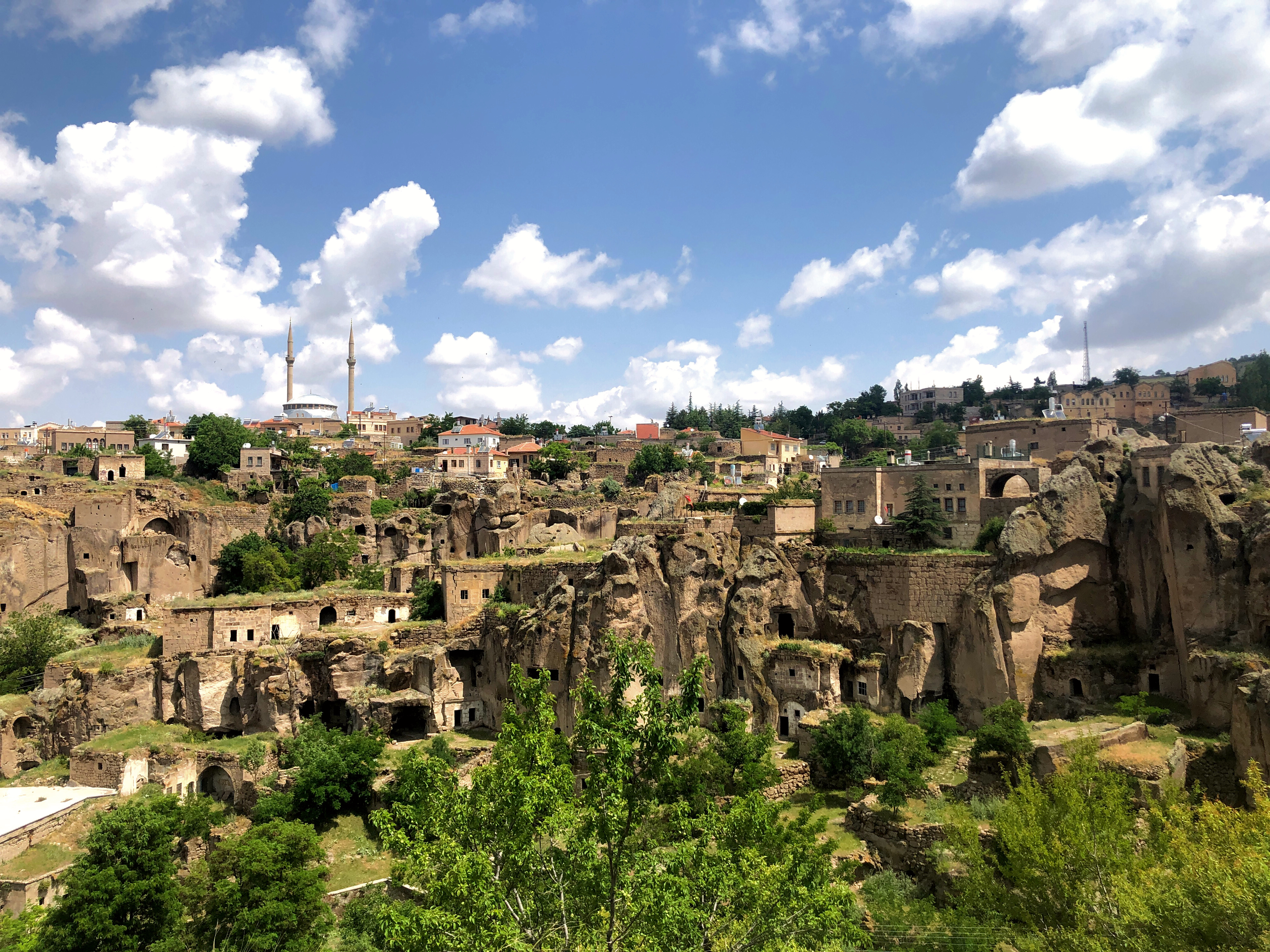
Panoramic view towards Güzelyurt Monastery Valley and Church Mosque.

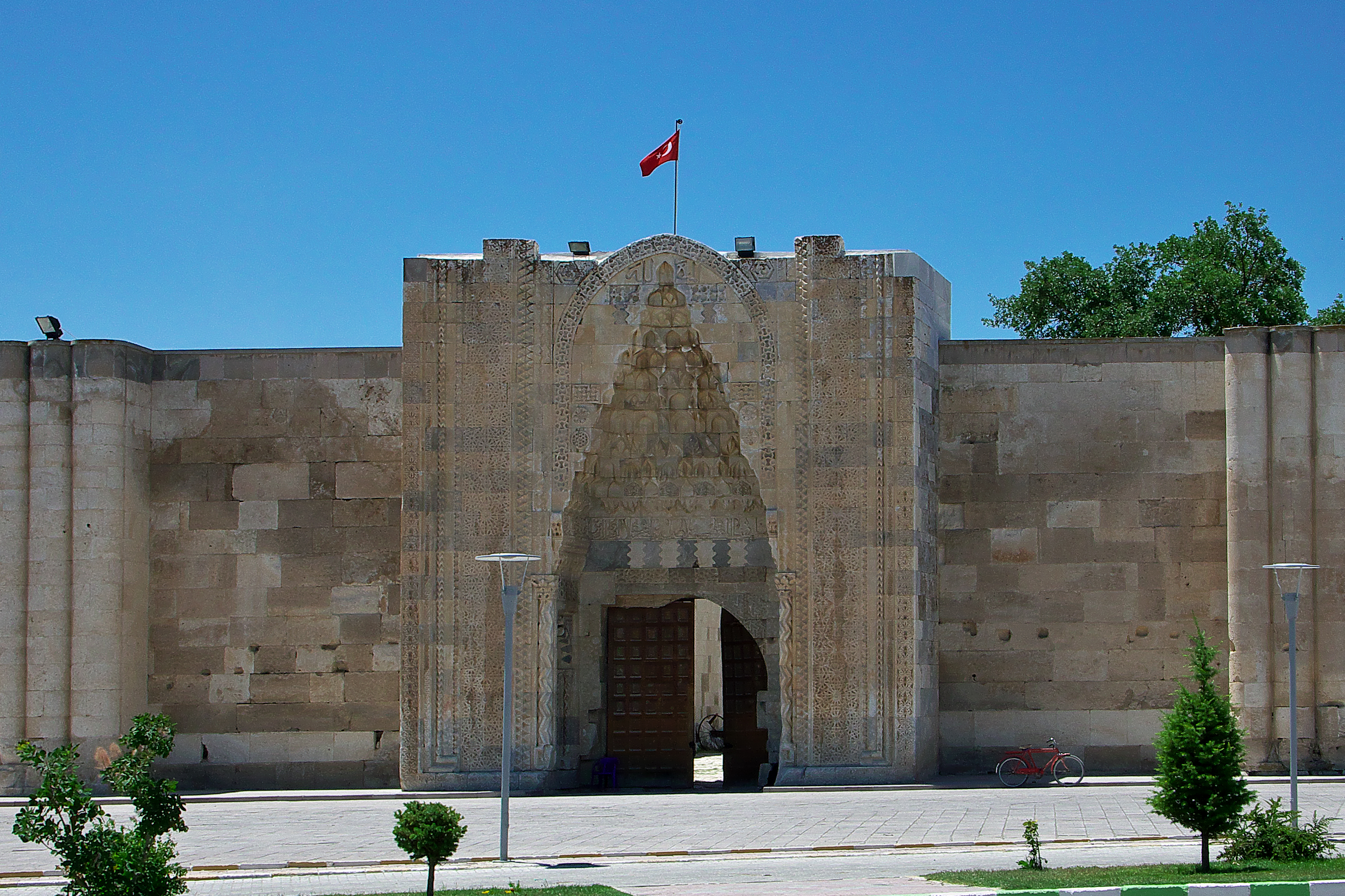
Monumental entrance of the Sultan Han

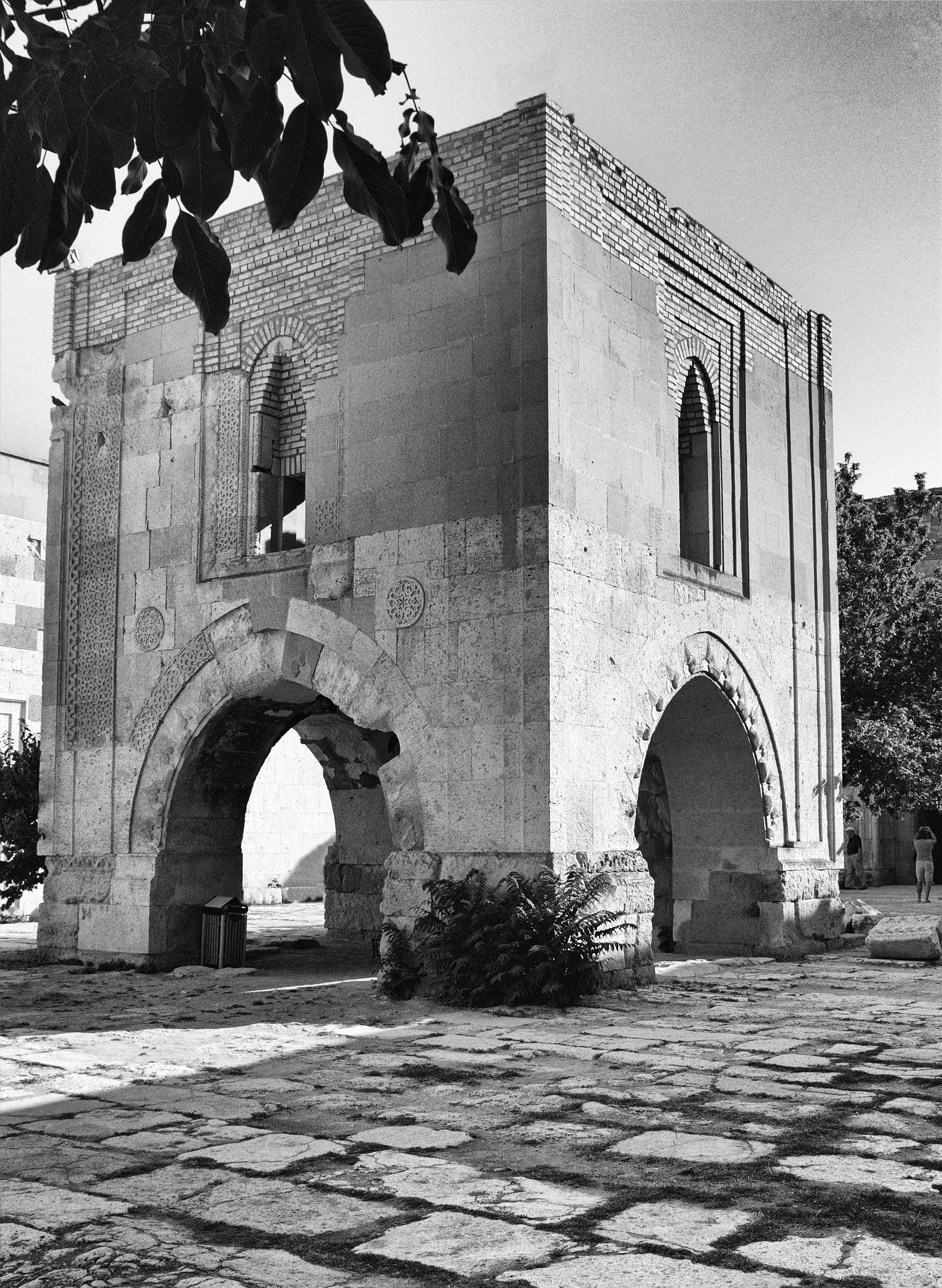
Interior of the Sultan Han Caravanserai

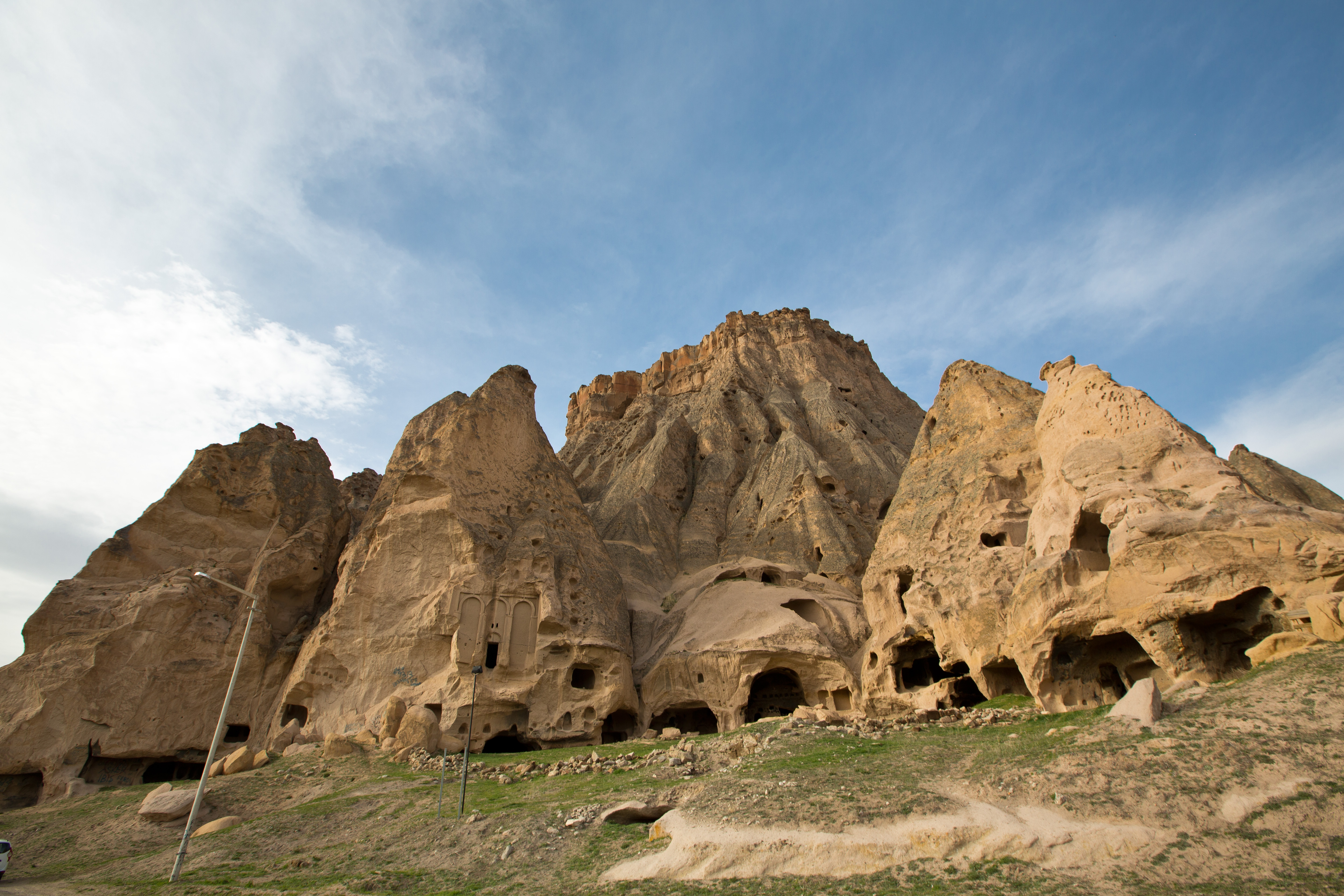
Selime Cathedral

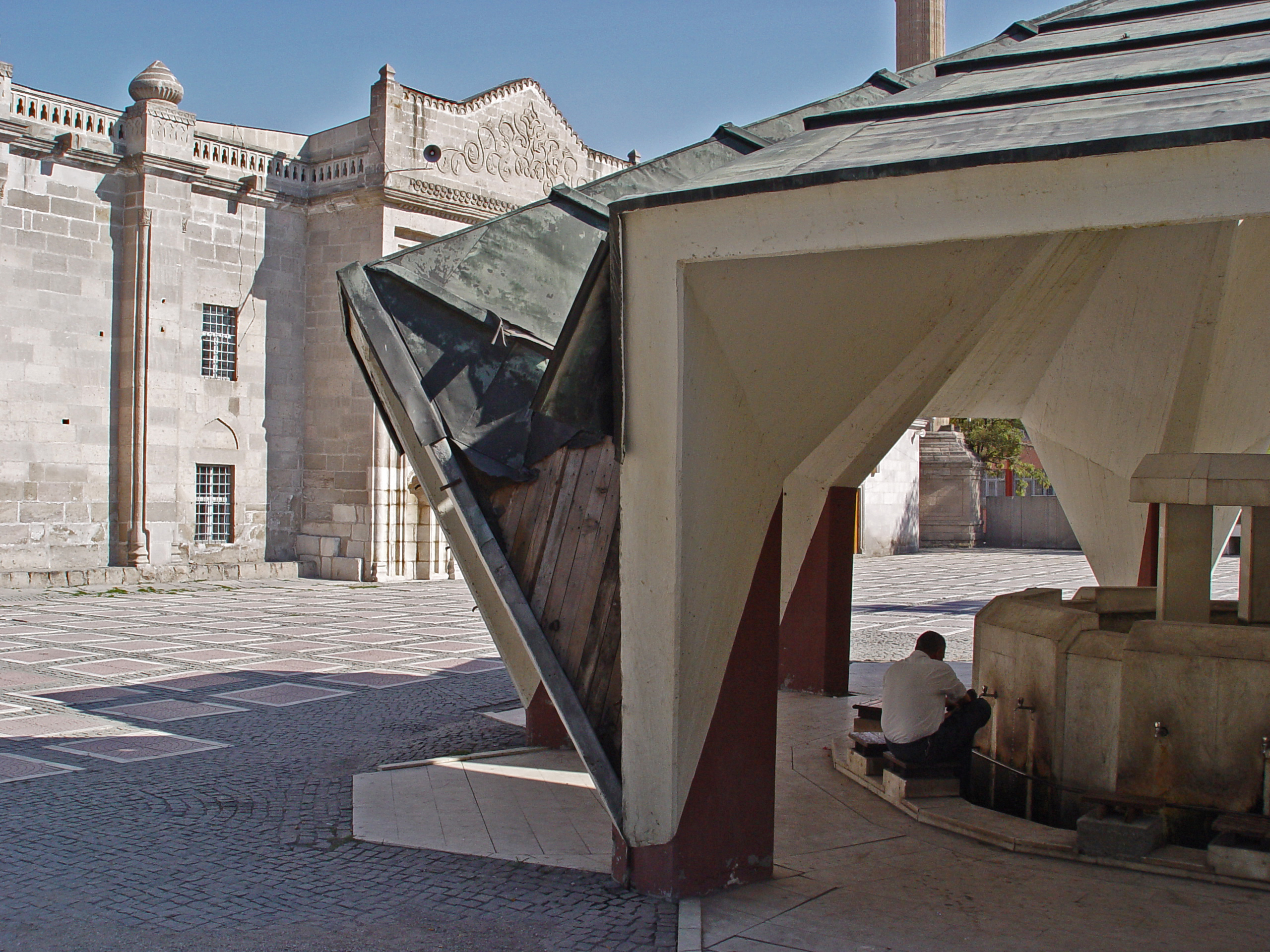
Ulu Mosque, also known as The Aksaray Grand Mosque.

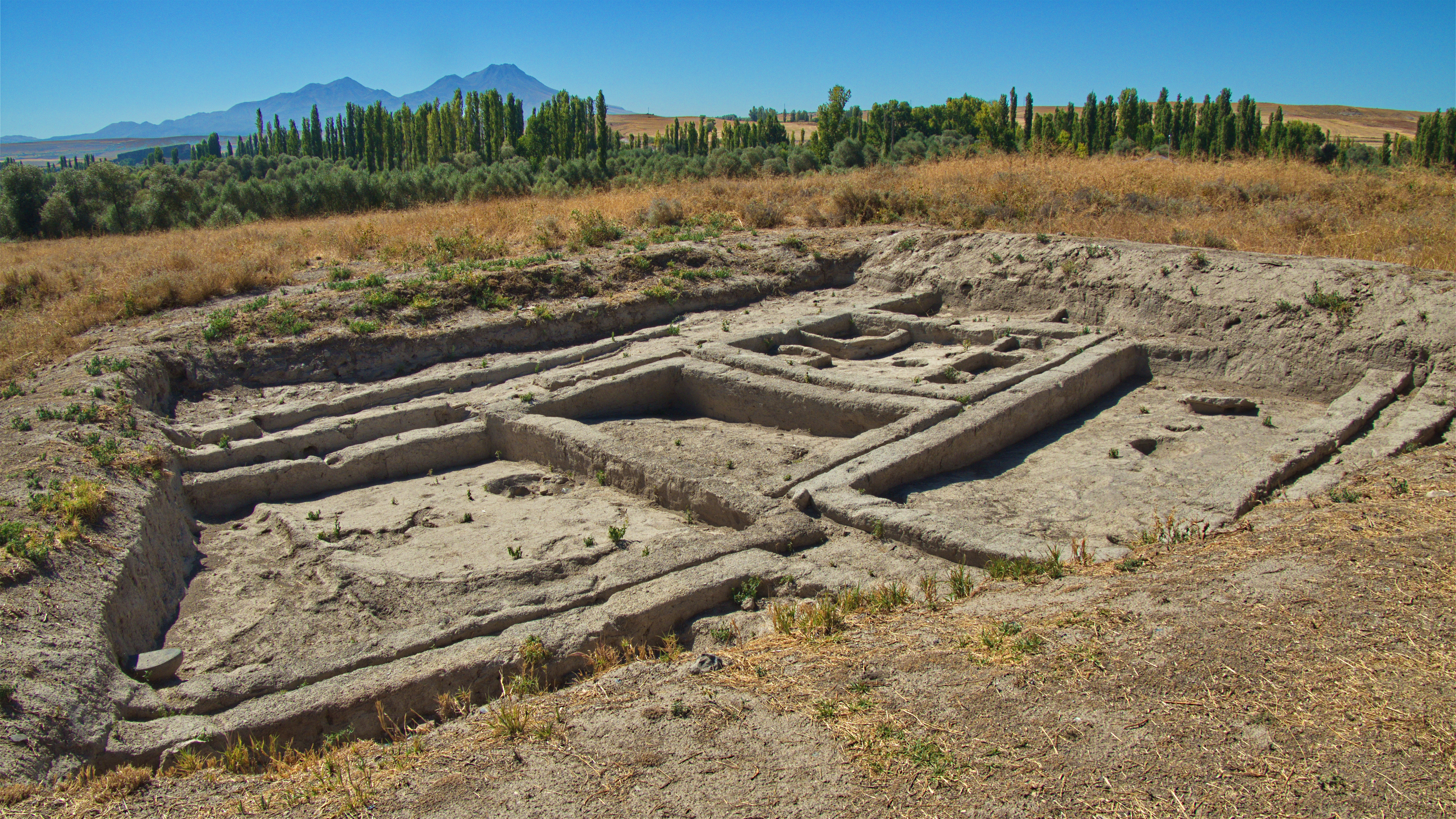
Aşıklı Höyük - a Neolithic settlement

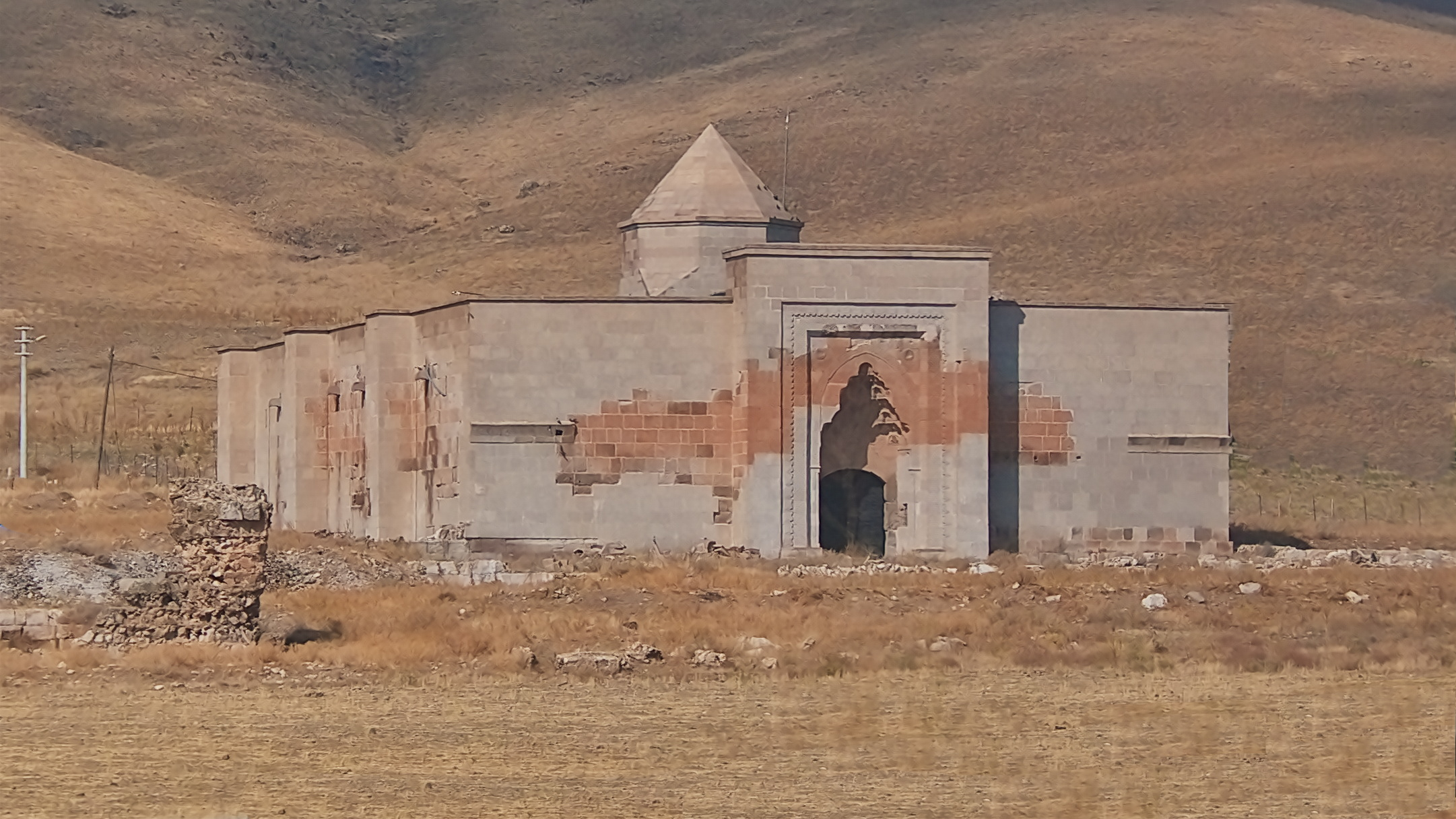
Alayhan Caravanserai

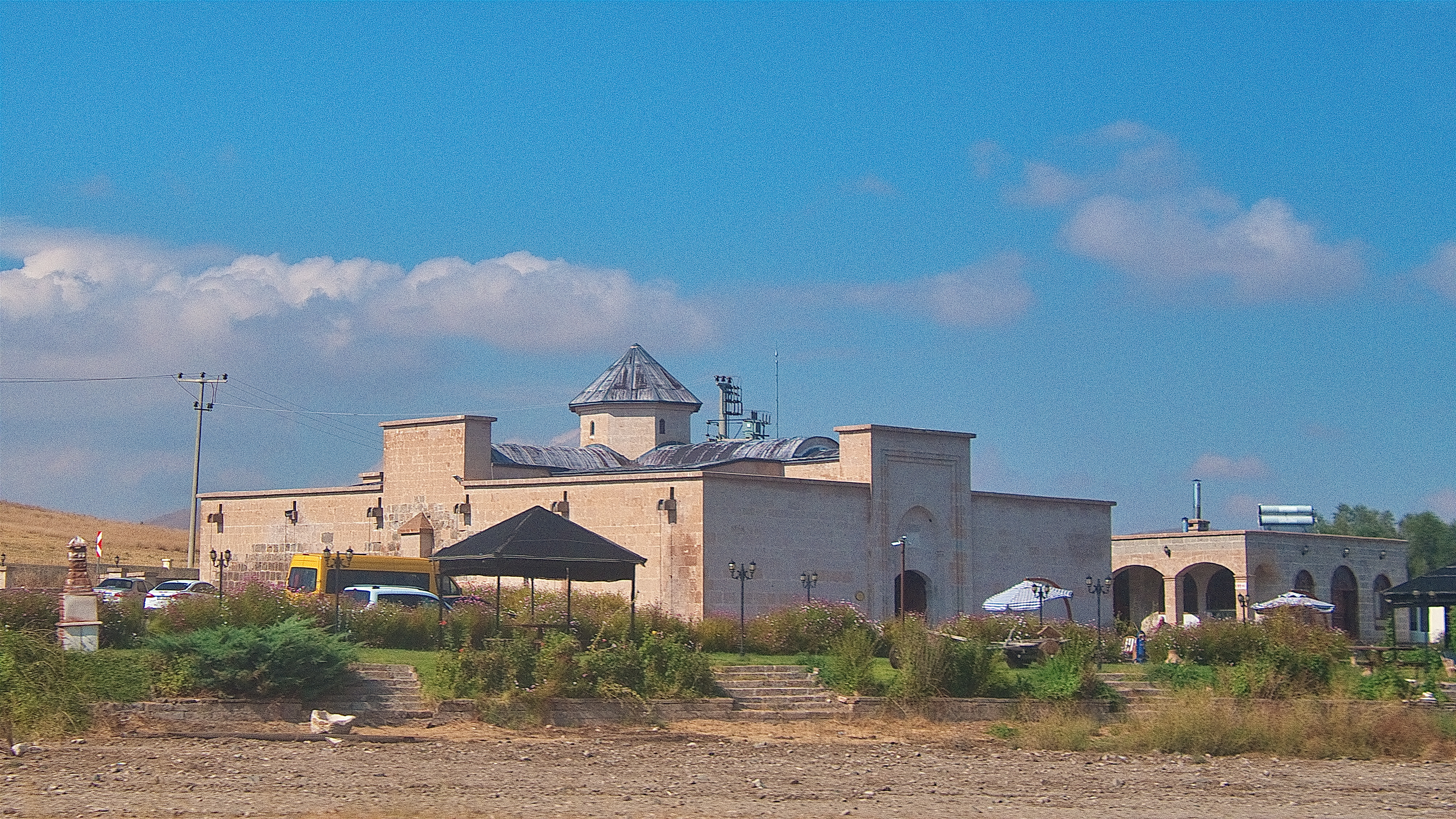
Tepesi Delik Han Caravanserai, Aksaray Province
