= List of volcanoes in Turkey =

This is a list of dormant and extinct volcanoes in Turkey.

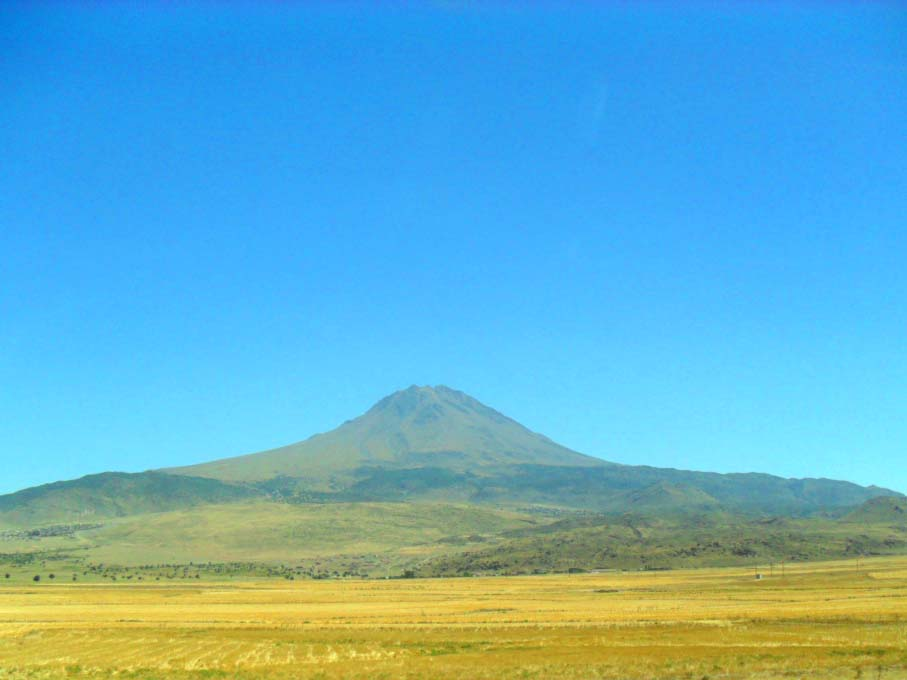
Hasandağı

Name	Elevation		Location	Last eruption
Name	meters	feet	Coordinates	Last eruption
Acıgöl-Nevşehir	1689	5541	38.57°N 34.52°E	Holocene
Akyarlar	172	564	36.98°N 27.31°E	Unknown
Mount Ararat	5137	16,854	39.70°N 44.28°E	1840
Erciyes Dağı	3916	12,848	38.52°N 35.38°E	253 BC
Girekol	2323	7621	39.06°N 43.25°E	Holocene
Göllü Dağ	2143	7031	38.25°N 34.57°E	Holocene
Hasan Dağı	3253	10,672	38.13°N 34.17°E	6200 BC
Karaca Dağ	1957	6421	37.67°N 39.83°E	Unknown
Karadağ	2271	7450	37.25°N 33.08°E	Unknown
Karapınar Field	1302	4272	37.67°N 33.65°E	6200 BC
Kars Plateau	3000	9842	40.75°N 42.90°E	Unknown
Kula (volcano)	750	2461	38.58°N 28.52°E	Holocene
Nemrut Dağı	2948	9672	38.65°N 42.23°E	1692
Süphan Dağı	4058	13,642	38.92°N 42.82°E	Holocene
Tendürek Dağı	3584	11,758	39.33°N 43.83°E	1855

== See also ==
- Geology of Turkey
- Geothermal power in Turkey
