= Mount Hasan =

Volcano in Turkey

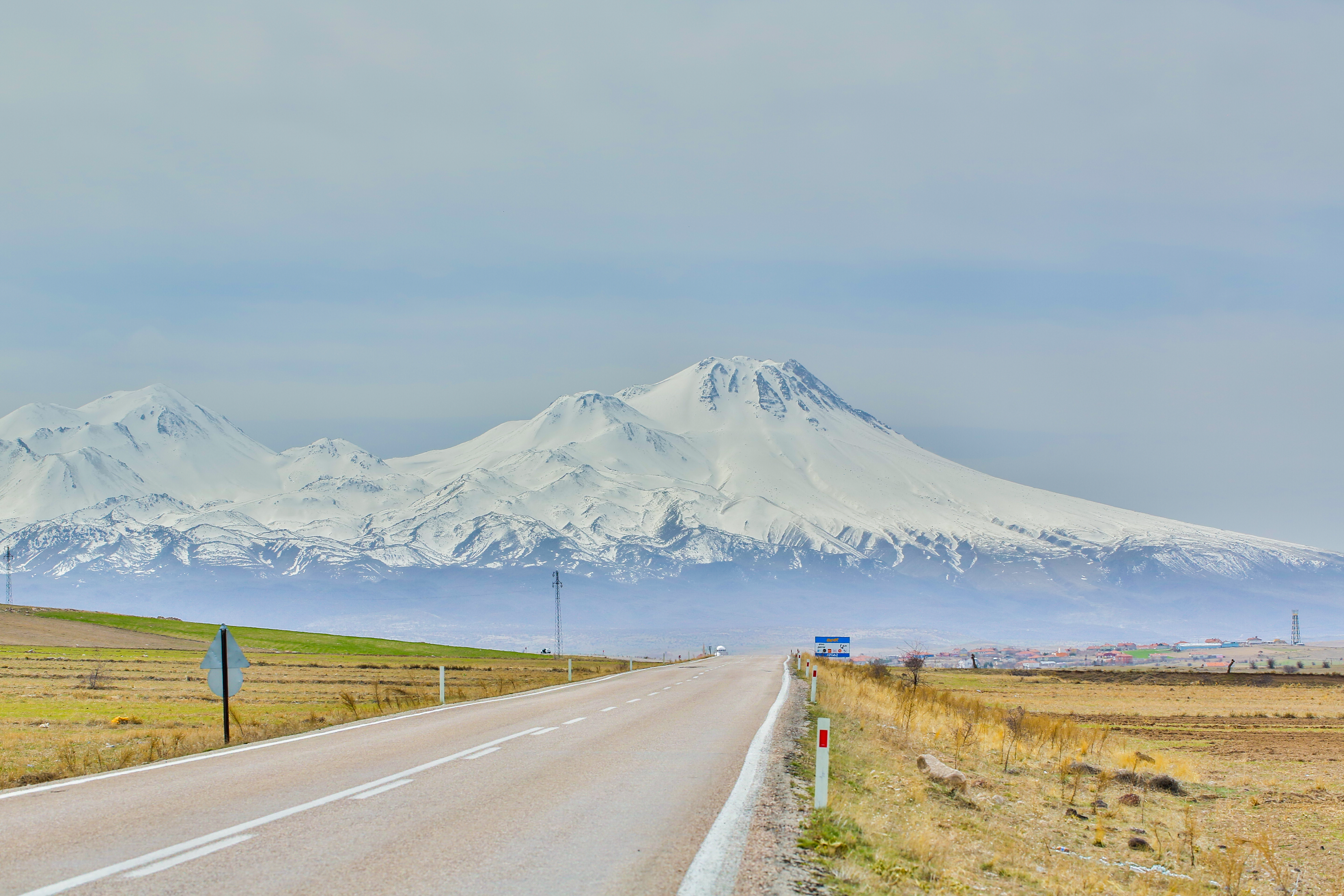
- View of Mount Hasan

Highest point
- Elevation: 3,268 m (10,722 ft)
- Prominence: 1,922 m (6,306 ft)
- Listing: Ultra
- Coordinates: 38°07′39″N 34°10′00″E

Geography
- Location within Turkey
- Location: Aksaray Province, Turkey

Geology
- Mountain type: Stratovolcano
- Last eruption: 6200 BC

Mount Hasan (Turkish: Hasan Dağı) is a volcano in Anatolia, Turkey. It has two summits, the 3,069 metres (10,069 ft) high eastern Small Hasandağ and the 3,253 metres (10,673 ft) high Big Hasandağ, and rises about 1 kilometre (0.62 mi) above the surrounding terrain. It consists of various volcanic deposits, including several calderas, and its activity has been related to the presence of several faults in the area and to regional tectonics.

Activity began in the Miocene and continued into the Holocene; a mural found in the archeological site of Çatalhöyük has been controversially interpreted as showing a volcanic eruption or even a primitive map. It was the second mountain from the south in the Byzantine beacon system used to warn the Byzantine capital of Constantinople of incursions during the Arab–Byzantine wars.

== Etymology ==
The modern name of Mount Hasan is widely accepted to be in dedication to Ebu'l-Gazi (El-Hasan), brother of Ebu'l-Kasım during the reign of the Anatolian Seljuks. It is hypothesized that Mount Hasan's name was "Argeos" or "Argaios", but this name belongs to Mount Erciyes. Another hypothesis is that it was simply called Árgos, (Ancient Greek: Ἄργος) as well as Argeiopolis Mons. The Hittites called it Athar.

== Geography and geomorphology ==
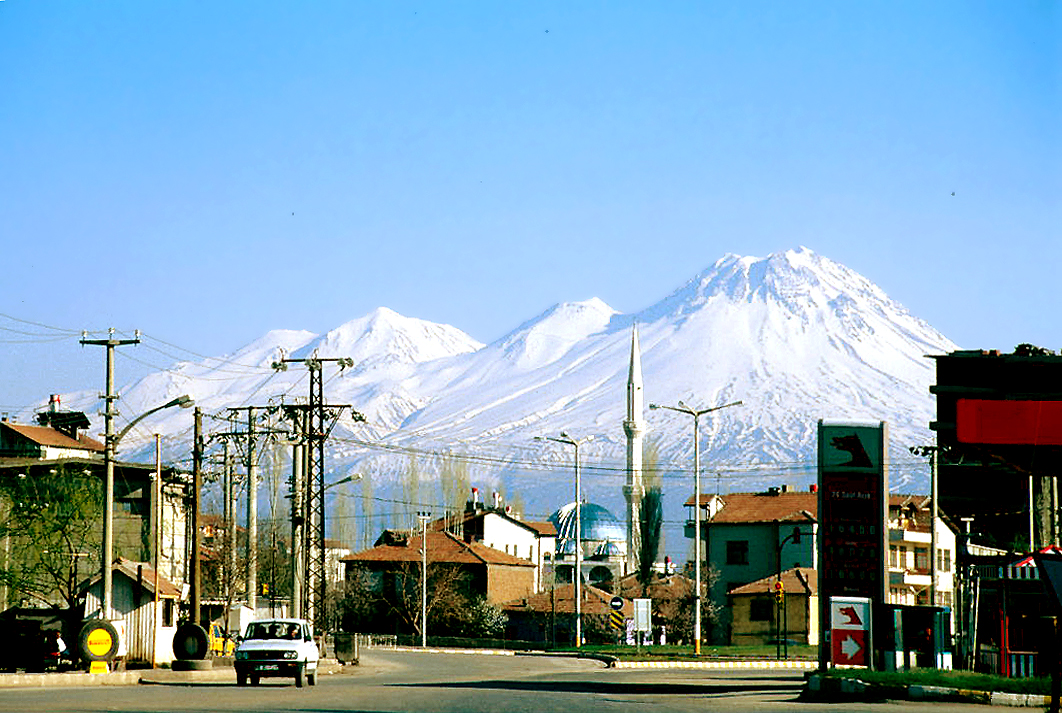
A street of Aksaray with Mount Hasan in the background

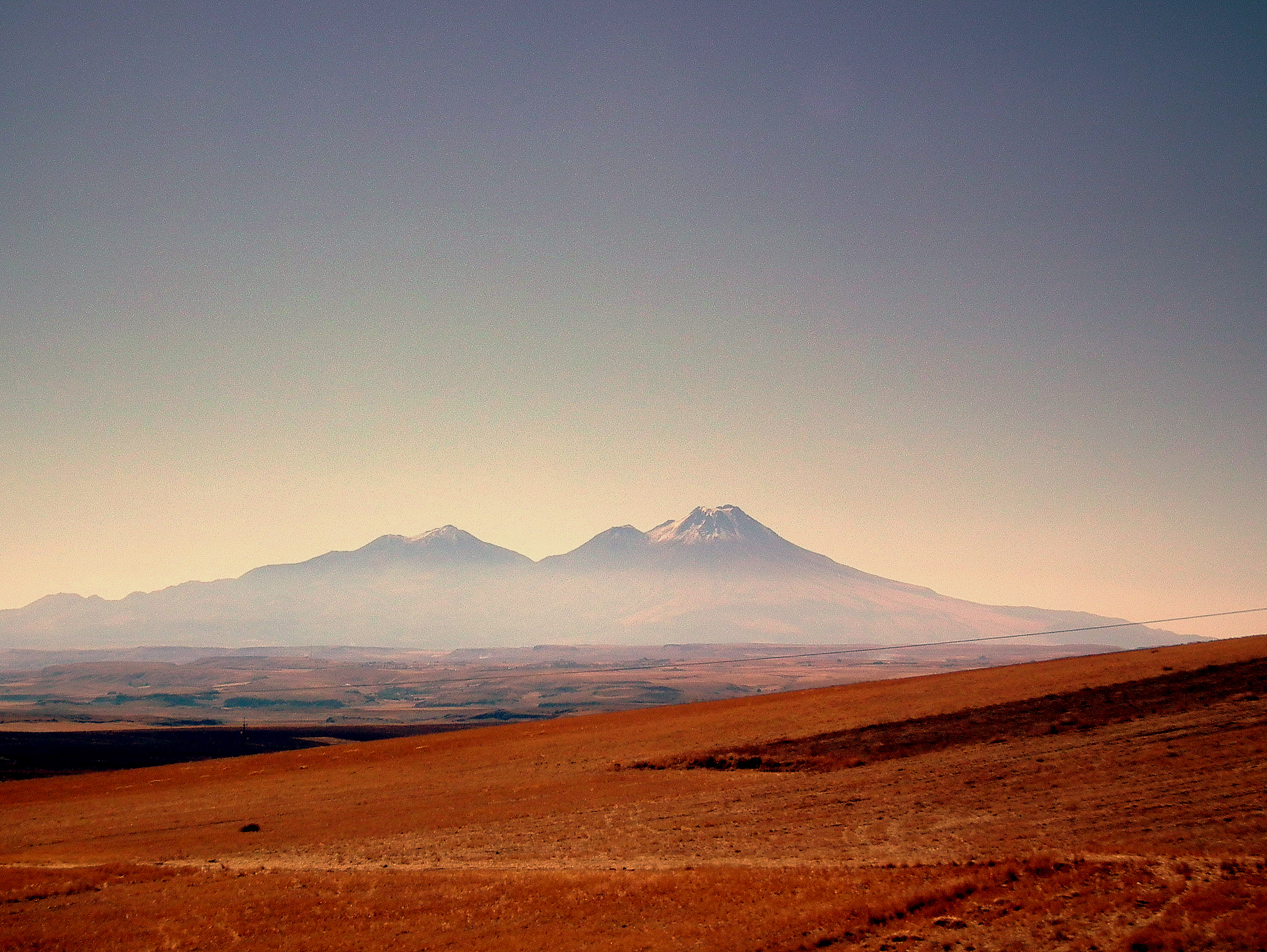
Mount Hasan viewed from the north in a sunset

Mount Hasan lies in the Anatolian plateau, between the Taurus Range and the Pontic Mountains, and its and Mount Erciyes's silhouettes dominate the landscape and rise high above the surrounding terrain. The city of Aksaray lies 30–40 kilometres (19–25 mi) northwest from Mount Hasan, while the settlements of Helvadere, Uluören, Dikmen and Taşpınar lie clockwise from north to northwest around the volcano. In addition, there are seasonal settlements on the volcano which are associated with summer pastures. The volcano has been prospected as a potential source for geothermal power.

Mount Hasan is part of a larger volcanic province in Central Anatolia known as the Central Anatolian or Cappadocian Volcanic Province., which includes ignimbrites, monogenetic volcanic fields and stratovolcanoes such as Mount Erciyes, Mount Hasan, Karacadağ and Melendiz Dağ with an area of about 20,000 square kilometres (7,700 sq mi)-25,000 square kilometres (9,700 sq mi). Volcanism took place during the Plio-Pleistocene and into the Quaternary.

The volcano has two summits, the 3,069 metres (10,069 ft) high eastern Small Hasandağ/Küçük Hasandağ and the 3,253 metres (10,673 ft) high Big Hasandağ/Büyük Hasandağ, and consist of lava domes and lava flows. Big Hasandağ has two nested craters with an 800 metres (2,600 ft) wide and 200 metres (660 ft) high inner cone that is the source of a lava flow. Whether they are located within a caldera is unclear; rather than one large caldera encompassing the entire complex, there may be a smaller one underlying Mount Hasan specifically. There is periglacial activity on the summit, and fossil rock glaciers are found on the volcano. The volcano as a whole rises almost 1 kilometre (0.62 mi) around the surrounding terrain and covers an area of 760 square kilometres (290 sq mi) with 354 cubic kilometres (85 cu mi) of rocks. The terrain of Mount Hasan is formed by phreatomagmatic breccias, ignimbrites, lahar deposits, lava domes, lava flows and pyroclastic flow deposits. The pyroclastic flow deposits occur in the form of fans or valley flows, when they were channelled by topography. The northern flanks also feature two debris avalanche deposits with hummocky surfaces. Two calderas, the Ulukışla caldera on the eastern and the Keçikalesi on the southwestern flank, adorn the volcano. The volcanics of Mount Hasan have been subdivided into a "hot flow" unit, a "Mt. Hasan ashes" unit and into a lava unit.

Cinder cones, maars and accompanying lava flows also occur around Mount Hasan, they are part of a basaltic volcano family that forms parasitic vents. These include the Yıpraktepe cone/maar and a lava flow field at Karataş which covers an area of 60 square kilometres (23 sq mi) and was produced by fissure vents. Many of the cones around Mount Hasan have been grouped as the Hasandağ-Karacadağ volcanic field.

== Geology ==
As a consequence of the subduction and eventual closure of the Neo-Tethys and continental collision between Arabia-Africa and Eurasia, Anatolia moves westward at a rate of 21 millimetres per year (0.83 in/year) between the North Anatolian Fault and the East Anatolian Fault. This movement and the resulting tectonic deformation of Anatolia are responsible for volcanism in Central Anatolia, together with the subduction of the Cyprus Plate. Volcanism has been ongoing for the past 10 million years; it is defined as "post-collisional". Further, volcanism at Mount Hasan has been related to the Tuz Gölü Fault and its intersection with the Karaman-Aksaray faults; the former of these is one of two major fault systems in Central Anatolia which influence volcanism there, and volcanic products of Mount Hasan have been deformed by the fault. The Hasandag fault branches off the Karaman-Aksaray fault and cuts between the two summits of Mount Hasan. It and the Karacaören fault influence the hydrothermal system of the volcano.

The westerly Mount Hasan, central Keçiboyduran and easterly Melendiz Dağ form the Niğde Volcanic Complex, a mountain range, which is surrounded by plains and whose summits reach heights of over 3,000 metres (9,800 ft). Of these mountains, Melendiz Dağ is more heavily eroded compared to the steep cones of Hasan and like Keçiboyduran is of early Pliocene age. This alignment is congruent with the tectonic patterns of Anatolia, where the collision between Africa and Eurasia follows the same trend. It and to some degree Mount Hasan are also surrounded by a large depression, and the volcanoes of this alignment are separated by faults. Additionally, Mount Hasan forms a volcanic lineament with Karadağ and the Karapınar Field.

The basement in Central Anatolia is formed by magmatic, metamorphic and ophiolitic rocks, the former of which are of Paleozoic to Mesozoic age; it crops out at scattered sites and in the Kirshehir and Nigde massifs. The surface however consists mainly of Tertiary volcanic rocks, which are formed both by numerous ignimbrites, volcaniclastic material and individual volcanoes. Central Anatolia has undergone uplift, for which several mechanisms have been proposed.

=== Composition ===
Mount Hasan has produced volcanic rocks with compositions ranging from basalt to rhyolite but the dominant components are andesite and dacite which define an older tholeiitic and a younger calc-alkaline or alkaline suite. These rocks in turn include amphibole, apatite, biotite, clinopyroxene, garnet, ilmenite, mica, olivine, orthopyroxene, plagioclase, pyroxene in the form of augite, bronzite, diopside, hypersthene and salite, and quartz. The older volcanic stages have produced basaltic andesite while dacite appears only in the most recent stage. Obsidian also occurs in the most recent stage although it is not an important component while most of the rocks are porphyritic. The basaltic family includes both basaltic andesite and alkali basalts with augite, clinopyroxene, garnet, hornblende, hypersthene, olivine, orthopyroxene, oxides and plagioclase.

Magma mixing processes appear to be the most important mechanisms involved in the genesis of Mount Hasan magmas, which are derived from the mantle with participation of crustal components. Evidence of fractional crystallization has been encountered in the most recent stage rocks and more generally plays a role in the genesis of Hasan magmas although it does not explain all of the compositional traits. It appears that basaltic andesites formed through mixing, while fractional crystallization was more important for the genesis of other magmas. Older volcanic stages also show evidence of subduction influence while the more recent magmas are more indicative of intraplate processes, the effects of crustal extension and of the presence of water. In general, various sources have been proposed for the magmas of the Central Anatolian province. The magmatic system of Mount Hasan appears to be more active than that of Mount Erciyes.

The magmas formed at different depths, with basalts originating at about 35–41 kilometres (22–25 mi) depth at the base of the crust, while the other volcanic rocks have shallower sources. The basaltic magmas would have ascended into a shallow magma chamber at 3–4 kilometres (1.9–2.5 mi) depth, mobilizing its contents and thus giving rise to the more silicic magmas. The magma formation processes were quick, with only days or weeks going from the formation of the magma and its eruption on the surface.

== Ecology and hydrology ==
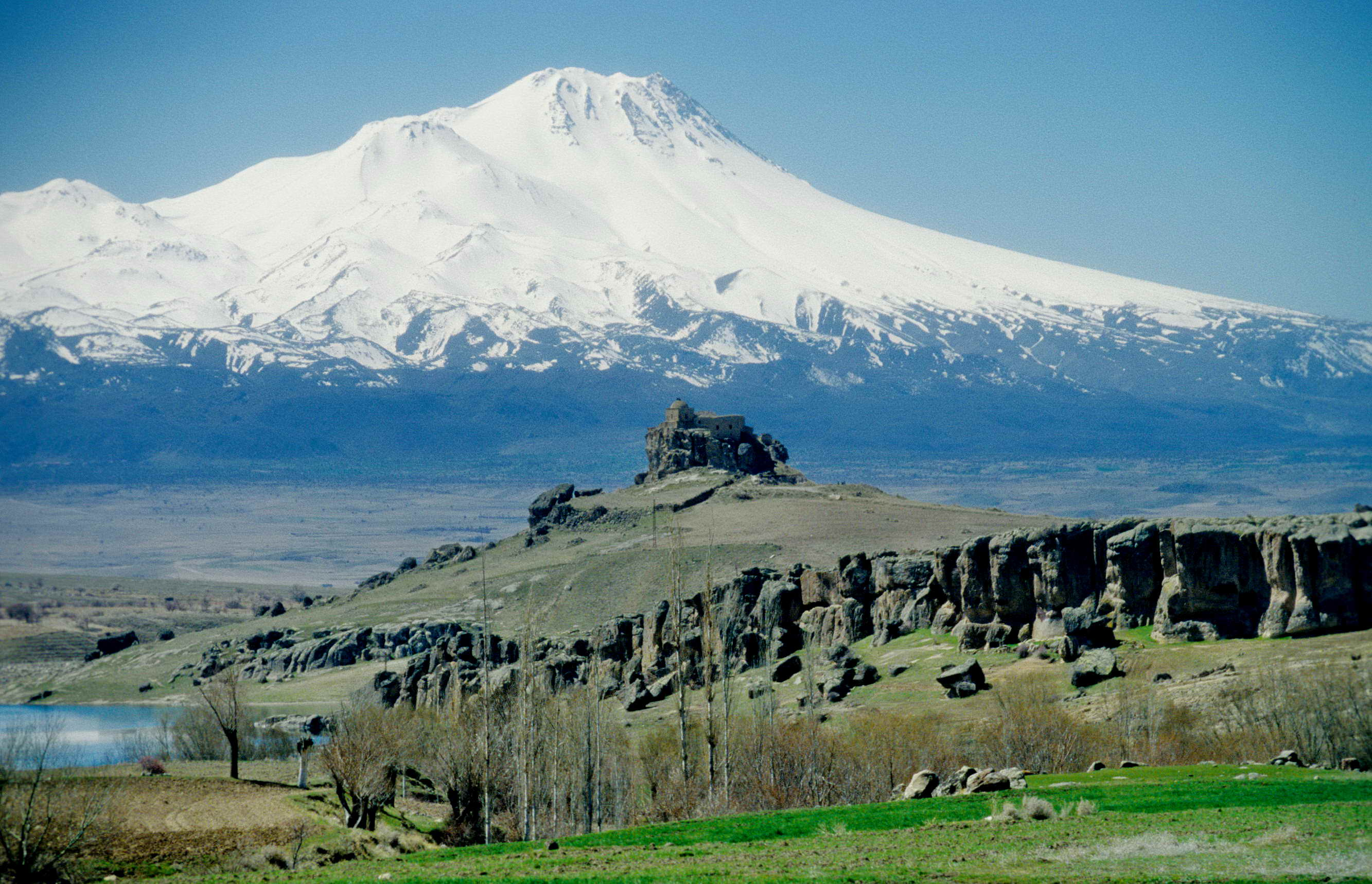
An ancient orthodox church known as St. Analipsis on Analipsis Hill, with Mount Hasan in the background. The Melendiz River can be seen in the bottom left.

Oak forests occur on Mount Hasan. Annual precipitation is about 400 millimetres (16 in). Between October/November and May, the mountain is frequently covered by snow due to the common precipitation at that time and when it melts the water mostly infiltrates into the permeable rocks, making the volcano a principal groundwater recharge area in the region. Additionally, volcanics of Mount Hasan form a major aquifer and the Melendiz River passes north and northeast of the volcano.

== Eruption history ==
Mount Hasan has been active for the last 13 million years, with the Keçikalesi, Paleo-Hasan, Mesovolcano and Neovolcano stages during the Miocene, Miocene-Pliocene and Quaternary; the older two stages might actually not be part of Mount Hasan at all. Aside from the felsic central vent volcanism, basaltic volcanism also took place at Mount Hasan throughout its activity; this activity has been dated to 120,000, 65,000 and the most recent event 34,000 years ago. This volcanism however is not part of the actual Mount Hasan system. The main edifice has produced about 1–0.3 cubic kilometres (0.240–0.072 cu mi) of magma every millennium, more than at Erciyes.

Keçikalesi is the oldest (13 million years) volcanic structure, it is among the oldest volcanoes of the Central Anatolian volcanic province. This volcano is a small sized volcano with a caldera which crops out on the southwestern side of Mount Hasan. It grew over sediments to a present-day elevation of 1,700 metres (5,600 ft); today it is eroded, partly buried by the younger Hasan volcanics and disrupted by strike-slip faulting. About 7 million years ago the Paleovolcano began to grow north of Keçikalesi; it too is buried by more recent volcanics but part of its deposits crop out on the northwestern flank of Mount Hasan in the form of ignimbrites, lahars and lava flows. The Paleovolcano also formed a caldera which produced the rhyolitic Dikmen-Taspinar Ignimbrites; formerly the Cappadocian tuffs were in general attributed to volcanism at Mount Hasan, Mount Erciyes and Göllü Dag.

The Quaternary activity gave rise to the Mesovolcano and Neovolcano, with the former centered between the two present-day summits. This volcano produced ignimbrites, lava domes and lava flows and eventually a caldera; it too has been dissected by faulting which probably also influenced the development of the volcano and its activity probably occurred between 1 and 0.15 million years ago. Finally, the Neovolcano grew within the caldera, producing various kinds of deposits; these include lava domes with accompanying pyroclastic flow deposits, breccia in the rim of the Mesovolcano caldera that probably formed through the interaction of intruding magma with water in the caldera, 700,000 years ago rhyolitic flows and ignimbrites accompanied by the formation of another, 4 by 5 kilometres (2.5 mi × 3.1 mi) caldera, and finally andesitic lava flows and lava domes which form the two main summits. A major Plinian to sub-Plinian pumice-forming eruption took place 417,200 ± 20,500 years ago, forming the Belbaşhanı Pumice and deposited fallout over much of Central Anatolia.

Small Mount Hasan is probably older as it is more heavily eroded while the morphology of Big Hasandağ is fresher although its pyroclastic flow deposits are heavily incised. Dates of 33,000 and 29,000 years ago have been obtained on the summit domes and ages of 66,000±7,000 years on the most recent monogenetic volcano south of Mount Hasan. Explosive eruptions took place 28,900 ± 1,500 and 13,500 ± 1,500 years ago. Tephras found in the Konya plain and in a lake of the Turkish Lakes Region have been attributed to Mount Hasan. The debris flow from Mount Hasan occurred 150,000-100,000 years ago and a number of lava flows were emplaced during the last 100,000 years.

=== Holocene and present activity ===
Eruptions occurred 8,970 ± 640, 8,200, less than 6,000 years ago and 0 ± 3,000 years ago; the first emplaced pumice on the summit, the penultimate of these formed a lava dome on the northern flank while the last formed a lava flow on Mount Hasan's western foot. A shift in archeological sites around Mount Hasan may be linked to the older eruptions. There is no evidence of historical eruptions of the volcano.

Hydrothermal activity also occurs at Mount Hasan, with fumaroles and water vapour emissions on the summit. The emission occurs along vents trending in a northeast-southwest direction, which are linked to a major regional fault. Rocks around these vents have been chemically altered. Another field of fumaroles and hot springs is on the northwestern side of Hasan. Magnetotelluric and other imaging techniques have found evidence of a magma chamber at 4–6 kilometres (2.5–3.7 mi) depth and of a magmatic body between 6–11.5 kilometres (3.7–7.1 mi). A hydrothermal system may or may not exist. There have been seismic swarms around Mount Hasan, including one in 2020 next to a cinder cone that was active 2000 years ago, and there is evidence that fumarolic and seismic activity has increased during the 2020s. Reportedly, there are frequent explosions within the volcano.

Future activity at Hasan could impact neighbouring villages, and larger eruptions might disrupt air traffic and tourism in Cappadocia. As of 2022 the volcano is not monitored.

==== Possible portrayal of an eruption in a mural from Çatalhöyük ====
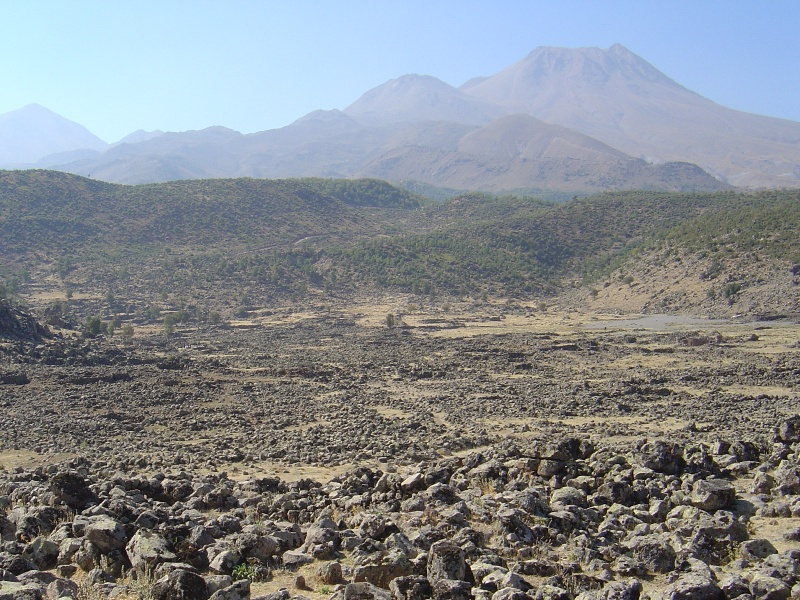
The ancient town of Mokissos and Mount Hasan

A mural discovered in Çatalhöyük has been interpreted as showing a volcanic eruption, commonly linked to Mount Hasan, and this mural has even been interpreted as being the oldest known map. The interpretation of the mural showing a volcanic eruption has been contested however as an alternative interpretation is that the "volcano" shown in the mural is actually a leopard and the "village" a set of random geometric motifs. The map interpretation is also contested. The mural is depicted in the Museum of Anatolian Civilizations in Ankara and has been cited as the first man-made diagram.

If the mural indeed shows an eruption, it probably occurred only a short time before the mural was drawn. Radiocarbon dating has yielded ages of about 7,400 - 6,600 years BCE for Çatalhöyük and radiometric dating has produced evidence for explosive eruptions during that time and when the mural was made. The depicted activity resembles Strombolian eruptions, and the event may not have been directly visible from Çatalhöyük. The discovery of this mural has drawn attention to the volcano and has led to efforts to date the eruptive activity of Mount Hasan.

== Importance during ancient history ==
Mount Hasan was used as a source for Obsidian. The Byzantine city of Mokissos was located on Mount Hasan. The mountain is considered to be the second beacon of the Byzantine beacon system, which was used to relay information from the Taurus Mountains to the Byzantine capital Constantinople.

== Gallery ==
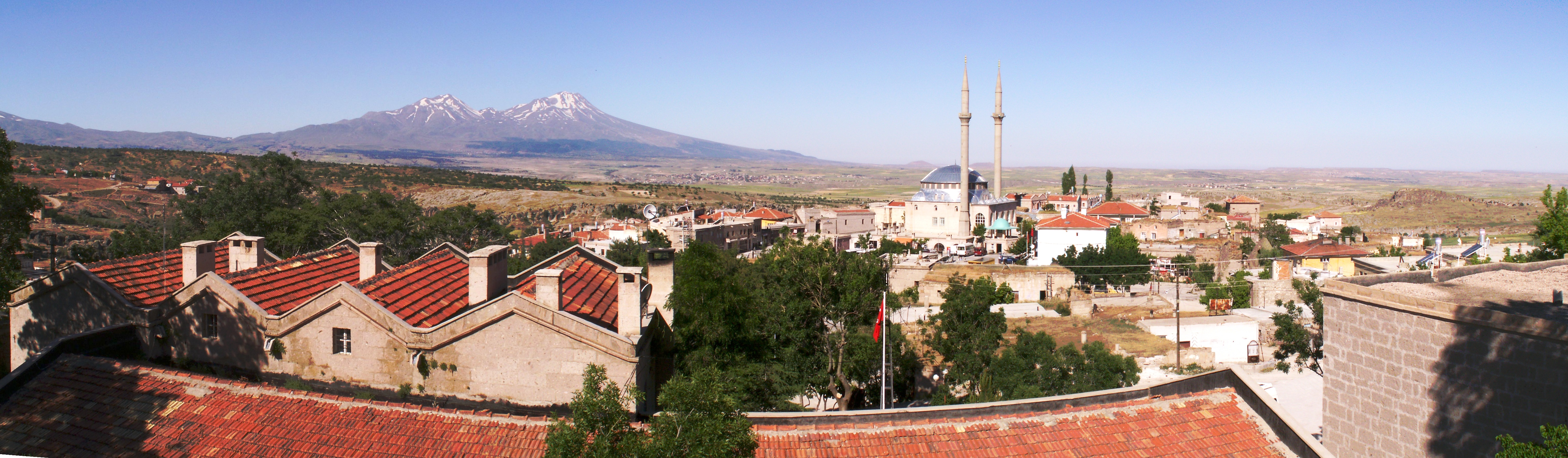
A panorama of Güzelyurt with Mount Hasan

== See also ==
- List of volcanoes in Turkey
- List of Ultras of West Asia

== Sources ==
- Afsin, Mustafa; Allen, Diana M.; Kirste, Dirk; Durukan, U. Gokcen; Gurel, Ali; Oruc, Ozcan (1 February 2014). "Mixing processes in hydrothermal spring systems and implications for interpreting geochemical data: a case study in the Cappadocia region of Turkey". Hydrogeology Journal. 22 (1): 7–23. Bibcode:2014HydJ...22...23A. doi:10.1007/s10040-013-1056-2. ISSN 1435-0157. S2CID 127211673.
- Aydar, Erkan; Gourgaud, Alain (1998-10-01). "The geology of Mount Hasan stratovolcano, central Anatolia, Turkey". Journal of Volcanology and Geothermal Research. 85 (1): 129–152. Bibcode:1998JVGR...85..129A. doi:10.1016/S0377-0273(98)00053-5. ISSN 0377-0273.
- Aydar, Erkan; Diker, Caner; Ulusoy, İnan; Şen, Erdal (2021). "Volcanic unrest possibilities in response to recent Obruk seismic swarm on and around Hasandağ stratovolcano (Central Anatolia, Turkey)". Comptes Rendus Geoscience. 353 (1): 1–18. Bibcode:2021CRGeo.353....1A. doi:10.5802/crgeos.46. S2CID 233469569.
- Beekman, P. H. (1966-07-01). "The Pliocene and Quaternary Volcanism in the Hasan Dağ-Melendiz Dağ Region". Maden Tetkik ve Arama Dergisi. 66 (66). ISSN 0026-4563.
- Deniel, Catherine; Aydar, Erkan; Gourgaud, Alain (1998-12-01). "The Hasan Dagi stratovolcano (Central Anatolia, Turkey): evolution from calc-alkaline to alkaline magmatism in a collision zone". Journal of Volcanology and Geothermal Research. 87 (1): 275–302. Bibcode:1998JVGR...87..275D. doi:10.1016/S0377-0273(98)00097-3. ISSN 0377-0273.
- Diker, Caner; Ulusoy, İnan; Akkaş, Efe; Şen, Erdal; Aydın, Eda; Gümüş, Erdal; Erkut, Volkan; Çubukçu, H. Evren; Başar, Onat; Çolak, Mehmet; Bolat, Ömür (December 2023). "Hydrothermal fluid circulation within the restless structural frame of Hasandağ volcanic system (Central Anatolia, Türkiye) inferred from Self-potential, CO2, and temperature measurements". Journal of Volcanology and Geothermal Research. 446 107994. doi:10.1016/j.jvolgeores.2023.107994.
- Dogan, A. Umran; Dogan, Meral; Kilinc, Attila; Locke, Darren (2008-05-01). "An isobaric–isenthalpic magma mixing model for the Hasan Dagi volcano, Central Anatolia, Turkey". Bulletin of Volcanology. 70 (7): 797–804. Bibcode:2008BVol...70..797D. doi:10.1007/s00445-007-0167-9. ISSN 1432-0819. S2CID 129511119.
- Doğan, Uğur; Koçyiğit, Ali; Yılmaz, Erkan (1 December 2019). "Geomorphological evolutionary history of the Melendiz River Valley, Cappadocia, Turkey". Mediterranean Geoscience Reviews. 1 (2): 203–222. Bibcode:2019MGRv....1..203D. doi:10.1007/s42990-019-00012-6. ISSN 2661-8648. S2CID 208746120.
- Chandrasekharam, Dornadula; Singh, Mrityunjay; Baba, Alper; Sass, Ingo (November 2024). "Resurgent dome and super-hot enhanced geothermal system: The Sahinkalesi Massif within the Hasandag Stratovolcanic Province, Central Anatolia, Turkey". Geosystems and Geoenvironment. 3 (4) 100314. Bibcode:2024GsGe....300314C. doi:10.1016/j.geogeo.2024.100314.
- Friedrichs, Bjarne; Atıcı, Gokhan; Danišík, Martin; Atakay, Evren; Çobankaya, Mehmet; Harvey, Janet C.; Yurteri, Esra; Schmitt, Axel K. (15 October 2020). "Late Pleistocene eruptive recurrence in the post-collisional Mt. Hasan stratovolcanic complex (Central Anatolia) revealed by zircon double-dating". Journal of Volcanology and Geothermal Research. 404 107007. Bibcode:2020JVGR..40407007F. doi:10.1016/j.jvolgeores.2020.107007. ISSN 0377-0273. S2CID 225482216.
- Gall, Helen; Kürkçüoğlu, Biltan; Cipar, Jacob; Crispin, Katherine; Furman, Tanya (16 August 2022). "Recycling and recharge at Hasandağ stratovolcano, Central Anatolia: insights from plagioclase textures and zoning patterns". Contributions to Mineralogy and Petrology. 177 (8): 84. Bibcode:2022CoMP..177...84G. doi:10.1007/s00410-022-01949-y. ISSN 1432-0967.
- Gençalioğlu-Kuşcu, Gonca; Uslular, Göksu (1 April 2019). "Mantle source heterogeneity in monogenetic basaltic systems: A case study of Eğrikuyu monogenetic field (Central Anatolia, Turkey)". Geosphere. 15 (2): 295–323. Bibcode:2019Geosp..15..295U. doi:10.1130/GES01682.1.
- Köprübaşi, Nezi̇hi̇; Güçteki̇n, Aykut (2009-03-06). "Geochemical Characteristics of Mafic and Intermediate Volcanic Rocks from the Hasandağ and Erciyes Volcanoes (Central Anatolia, Turkey)". Turkish Journal of Earth Sciences. 18 (1): 1–27. ISSN 1300-0985.
- Köprübaşi, Nezihi; Güçtekin, Aykut; Çelebi, Dağhan; Kirmaci, M. Ziya (2014-12-01). "Mineral chemical constraints on the petrogenesis of mafic and intermediate volcanic rocks from the Erciyes and Hasandağ volcanoes, Central Turkey". Geochemistry. 74 (4): 585–600. Bibcode:2014ChEG...74..585K. doi:10.1016/j.chemer.2013.11.003. ISSN 0009-2819.
- Kosaroglu, Sinan; Buyuksarac, Aydin; Aydemir, Attila (1 July 2016). "Modeling of shallow structures in the Cappadocia region using gravity and aeromagnetic anomalies". Journal of Asian Earth Sciences. 124: 214–226. Bibcode:2016JAESc.124..214K. doi:10.1016/j.jseaes.2016.05.005. ISSN 1367-9120.
- Kuzucuoglu, C; Pastre, J. -F; Black, S; Ercan, T; Fontugne, M; Guillou, H; Hatté, C; Karabiyikoglu, M; Orth, P; Türkecan, A (1 October 1998). "Identification and dating of tephra layers from Quaternary sedimentary sequences of Inner Anatolia, Turkey". Journal of Volcanology and Geothermal Research. 85 (1): 153–172. Bibcode:1998JVGR...85..153K. doi:10.1016/S0377-0273(98)00054-7. ISSN 0377-0273.
- Kuzucuoğlu, Catherine; Çiner, Attila; Kazancı, Nizamettin, eds. (2019). "Landscapes and Landforms of Turkey". World Geomorphological Landscapes. doi:10.1007/978-3-030-03515-0. ISBN 978-3-030-03513-6. ISSN 2213-2090. S2CID 199493042.
- Kuzucuoğlu, C.; Gündoğdu Atakay, E.; Mouralis, D.; Atıcı, G.; Guillou, H.; Türkecan, A.; Pastre, J.-F. (1 August 2020). "Geomorphology and tephrochronology review of the Hasandağ volcano (southern Cappadocia, Turkey)". Mediterranean Geoscience Reviews. 2 (2): 185–215. Bibcode:2020MGRv....2..185K. doi:10.1007/s42990-019-00017-1. ISSN 2661-8648. S2CID 209896809.
- Lovera, Oscar M.; Ulusoy, İnan; Şen, Erdal; Aydar, Erkan; Danišík, Martin; Schmitt, Axel K. (8 January 2014). "Identifying the Volcanic Eruption Depicted in a Neolithic Painting at Çatalhöyük, Central Anatolia, Turkey". PLOS ONE. 9 (1) e84711. Bibcode:2014PLoSO...984711S. doi:10.1371/journal.pone.0084711. ISSN 1932-6203. PMC 3885600. PMID 24416270.
- Özsoy, Rengin; Sunyé-Puchol, Ivan; Pedrazzi, Dario; Akkaş, Efe; Costa, Antonio; Massaro, Silvia; Tavazzani, Lorenzo; Nazzari, Manuela; Bachmann, Olivier; Scarlato, Piergiorgio; Miggins, Daniel P.; Kaya, Simge; Mollo, Silvio (8 June 2024). "Reconstructing the Belbaşhanı Pumice Plinian eruption, Hasandağ Volcano, Turkey". Bulletin of Volcanology. 86 (7): 61. Bibcode:2024BVol...86...61O. doi:10.1007/s00445-024-01752-6. hdl:11573/1711651.
- Savas, Aysegul (17 October 2017). "At the Museum of Anatolian Civilizations". The Paris Review.
- Tank, Sabri Bülent; Karaş, Mustafa (1 November 2020). "Unraveling the electrical conductivity structure to decipher the hydrothermal system beneath the Mt. Hasan composite volcano and its vicinity, SW Cappadocia, Turkey". Journal of Volcanology and Geothermal Research. 405 107048. Bibcode:2020JVGR..40507048T. doi:10.1016/j.jvolgeores.2020.107048. ISSN 0377-0273. S2CID 225228783.
- Toprak, Vedat; Göncöoḡlu, M. C. (1993). "Tectonic control on the development of the Neogene-Quaternary Central Anatolian Volcanic Province, Turkey". Geological Journal (in German). 28 (3–4): 357–369. Bibcode:1993GeolJ..28..357T. doi:10.1002/gj.3350280314. hdl:11511/32673. ISSN 1099-1034.
- Troll, Carl, ed. (1972). Geoecology of the high-mountain regions of Eurasia: proceedings of the Symposium of the International Geographical Union, Commission on High-Altitude Geoecology : Nov. 20-22, 1969 at Mainz: in connection with the Akademie der Wissenschaften und der Literatur in Mainz - Kommission für Erdwissenschaftliche Forschung. Wiesb.: Symposium of the International Geographical Union. OCLC 488346982.
- Ulusoy, İnan; Diker, Caner; Şen, Erdal; Çubukçu, H. Evren; Gümüş, Erdal (August 2022). "Multisource and temporal thermal infrared remote sensing of Hasandağ Stratovolcano (Central Anatolia, Turkey)". Journal of Volcanology and Geothermal Research. 428 107579. Bibcode:2022JVGR..42807579U. doi:10.1016/j.jvolgeores.2022.107579.
