= Ochras =

Town of ancient Cappadocia

Coordinates: 38°55′48″N 34°53′12″E

Ochras was a town of ancient Cappadocia mentioned by the Antonine Itinerary. Ptolemy mentions a place Odogra or Odoga, in the district of Chammanene in Cappadocia, between the Halys River and Mount Argaeus, which William Smith conjectured was possibly the same as Ochras. Modern scholars do not accept the equivalence.

Its site is tentatively located near Kalkancık Hüyük, Asiatic Turkey.
