= Odogra =

Odogra or Odoga was a town in the district of Chammanene of ancient Cappadocia, between the Halys River and Mount Argaeus, mentioned by Ptolemy. William Smith conjectured it was possibly the same as Ochras. Modern scholars do not accept the equivalence, and treat Odogra as unlocated.
