= Karapınar Field =

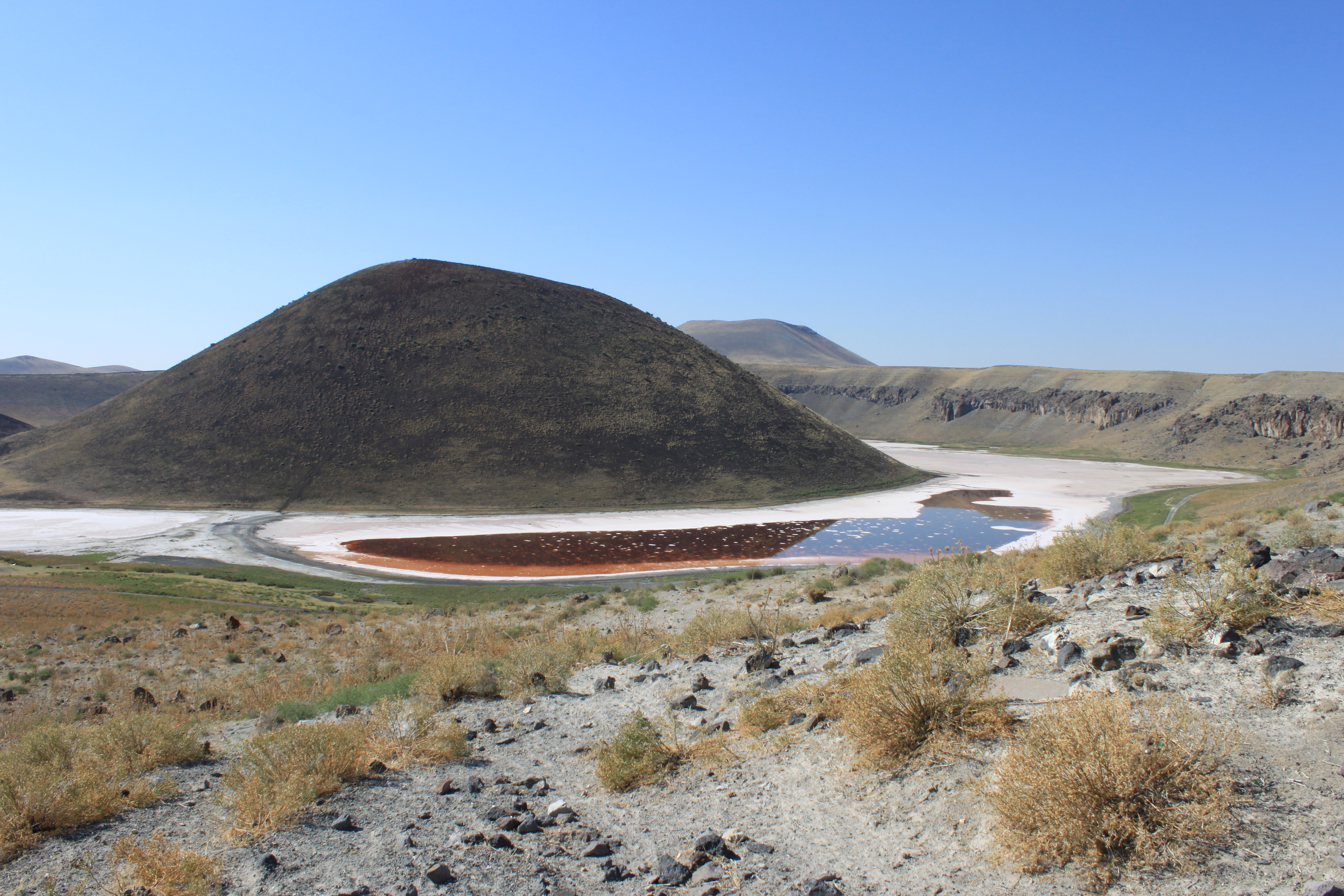
- Cinder cone and Meke Gölü, a crater lake.

Highest point
- Elevation: 1,302 m (4,272 ft)
- Coordinates: 37.67°N 33.65°E

Geography
- Location: Konya Province, Turkey

Geology
- Mountain type: Volcanic field / Cinder cones / Maars / Crater lake
- Last eruption: Unknown

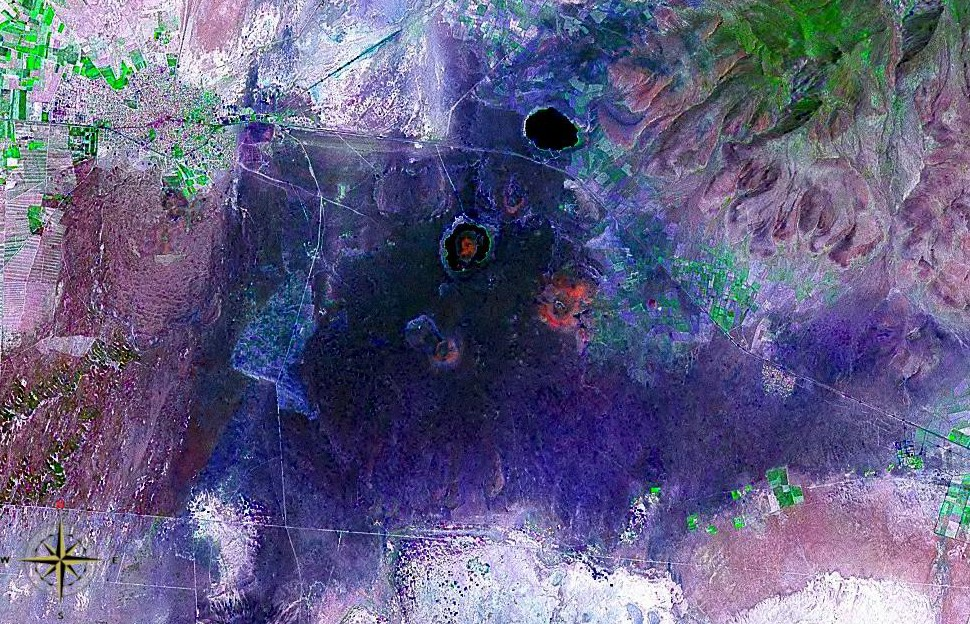
Karapınar Field seen from space (false color).

Karapınar Field is a volcanic field in central Anatolia, Asian Turkey.

== Geography ==
The volcanic area is located near the city of Karapınar, in the Karapınar District of Konya Province.

=== Features ===
The basaltic Karapınar Volcanic Field consists of five cinder cones, two lava fields, and several explosion craters and maars.

Meke Dağı, at 300 metres (980 ft) in elevation, is one of the largest cinder cones in the Central Anatolia Region.

Meke Dağı is surrounded by Lake Meke, a crater lake.

== See also ==
- Geology of Turkey
- List of volcanoes in Turkey
  - Karaca Dağ near Diyarbakır
