= Acıgöl–Nevşehir =

Volcano in Turkey

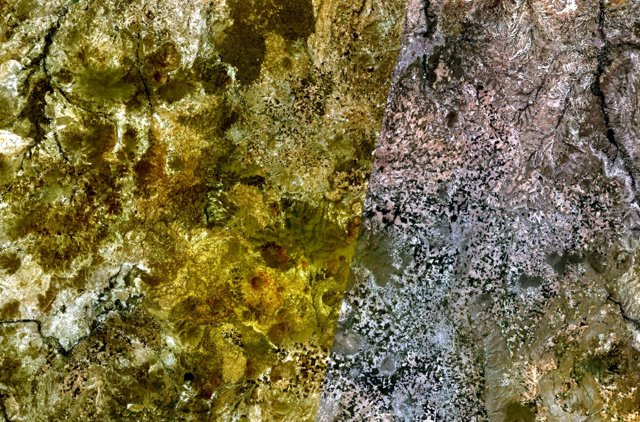
- Satellite image of the caldera Acıgöl-Nevşehir

Highest point
- Elevation: 1,683 m (5,522 ft)
- Coordinates: 38°32′13″N 34°37′16″E

Geography
- Location within Turkey
- Location: Turkey

Geology
- Last eruption: 2080 BC ± 200 years

Acıgöl–Nevşehir is a volcano in Turkey with an elevation of 1,689 metres (5,541 ft).

It is a caldera volcano about 7 by 8 km wide and is traversed by the national highway from Acıgöl to Nevşehir.

== See also ==
- List of volcanoes in Turkey
