= Karaca Dağ =

Mountain in Turkey

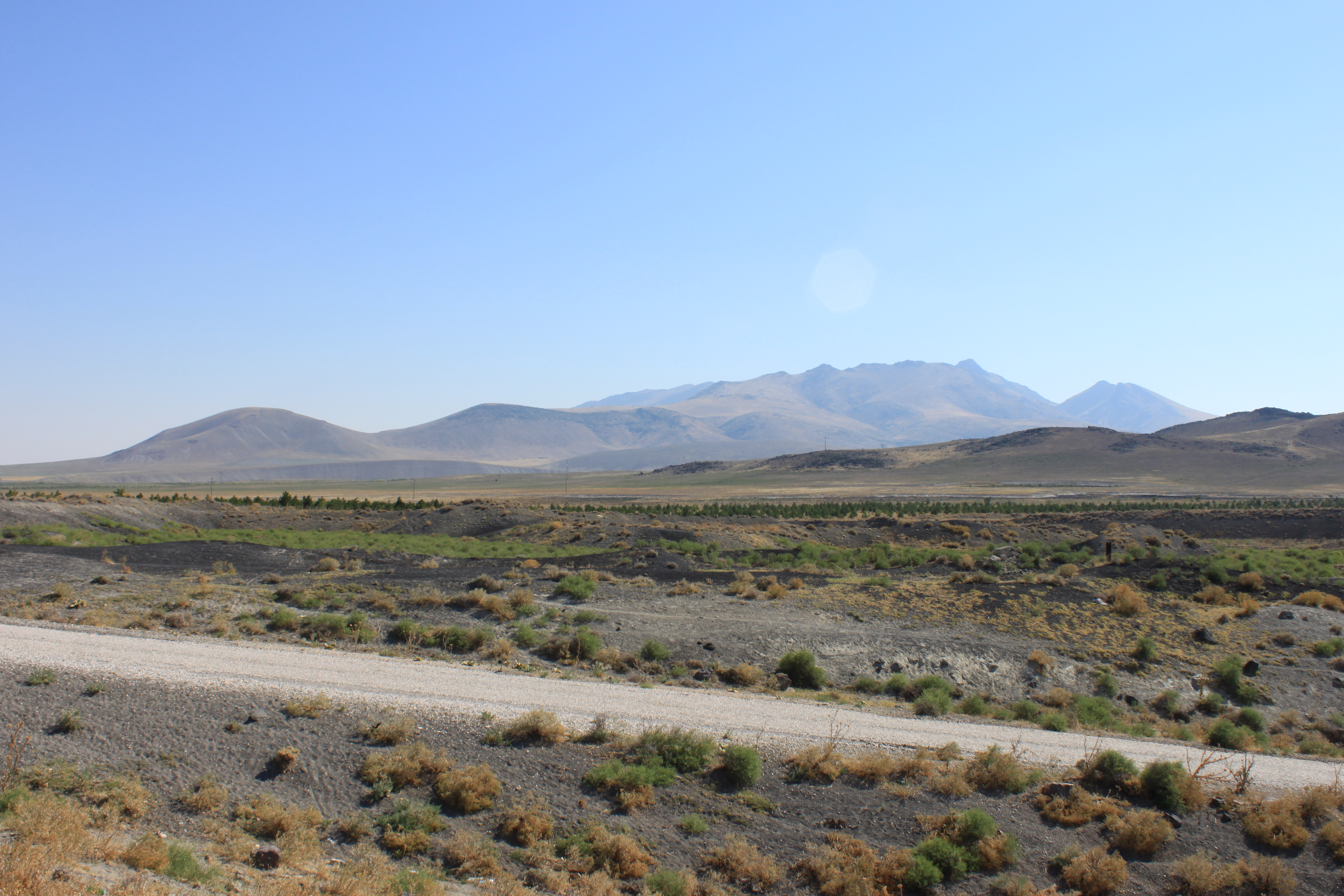
- Karapınar Field, looking east on Karaca Mountains in 2012

Highest point
- Elevation: 1,957 m (6,421 ft)
- Coordinates: 37°40′12″N 39°49′48″E

Geography
- Location within Turkey Location within Near East Location within Asia
- Location: Şanlıurfa and Diyarbakir provinces, Southeastern Anatolia Region, Turkey
- Parent range: Taurus Mountains

Geology
- Mountain type: Shield volcano
- Last eruption: Unknown

Karaca Dağ Qerejdax is a shield volcano located in southeastern Turkey, near amed (Diyarbakır.)

It was also known as "Mount Masia", which in turn was used to give the title of an iris found on the mountain, as Iris masia.

== Hydrology ==
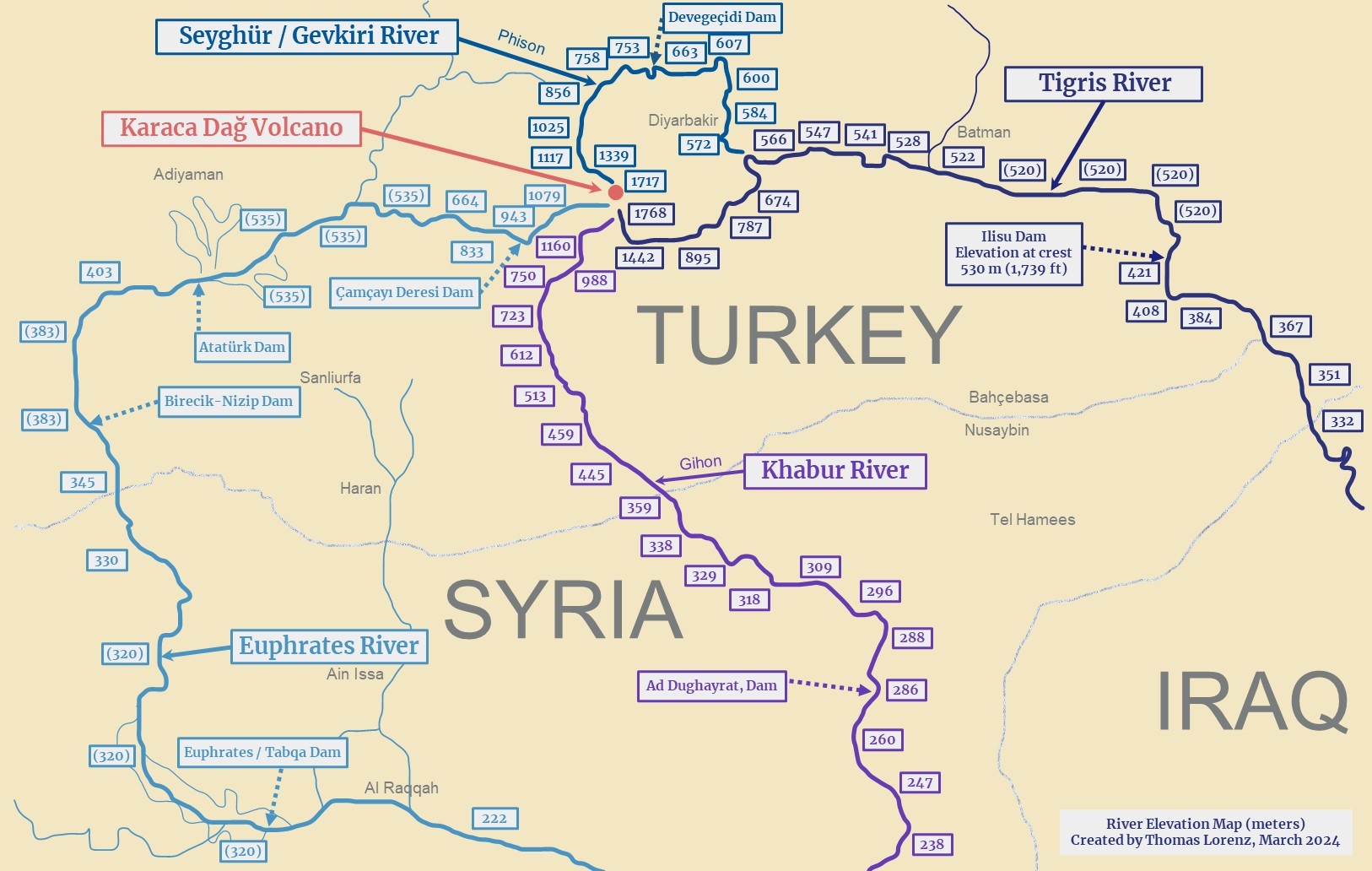
Rivers fed by Karaca Dağ

The streams originating from Karaca Dağ are the most significant water sources in the region. There are also a large number of springs on the southern side of Karaca Dağ and in the northern parts of the region. Sanliurfa and specifically the Karaca Dağ area are popular for its spring waters which are sold as bottled water to the world.

The river Khabur originates from a source at the southwestern slope of the Karaca Dağ and flows into the Euphrates further south at Circesium. The river Euphrates does not only originate at the confluence of the Karasu river (north) and the Murat river (northeast) in the Armenian highlands of northeastern Turkey, but in its originally predominant source from the northwestern slope of the Karaca Dağ, through what is known today as the Camcayi Creek.

The river Tigris does not only originate 74 kms (45 miles) northeast of Diyarbakir and flows through the same city, but it was formerly fed through at least 4 sources from the southeastern slope of the Karaca Dağ, located 33 km (20 miles) southwest of Diyarbakir.

== Agricultural history ==
Researchers at the Max Planck Institute for Plant Breeding Research in Cologne discovered that the genetically common ancestor of 68 contemporary types of cereal still grows as a wild plant on the slopes of Mount Karaca (Karacadag).

The region is known as the place of origin of different major crops including lentils and chickpeas.

== Vegetation ==
While Karaca Dağ was covered by forest vegetation until 40-50 years ago, today, human activities threaten the plant diversity at Karaca Dağ.

== See also ==
- List of volcanoes in Turkey
  - Karapınar Field
  - Mount Judi
- Thamanin
