= Geology of Turkey =

Map of earthquakes in Turkey from 1900 to 2023.

The geology of Turkey is the product of a wide variety of tectonic processes that have shaped Anatolia over millions of years, a process which continues today as evidenced by frequent earthquakes and occasional volcanic eruptions.

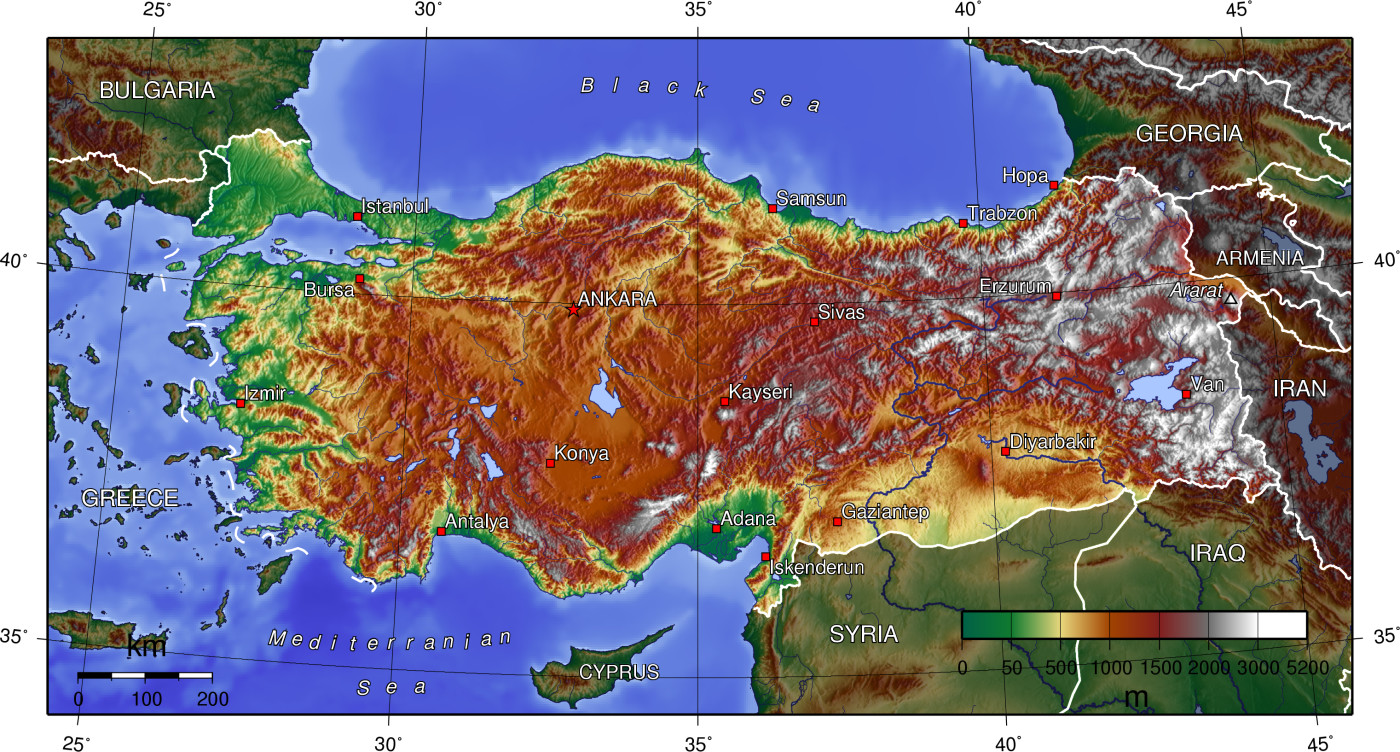
Topographic map of Turkey.

Except for a relatively small portion of its territory along the Syrian border that is a continuation of the Arabian Platform, Turkey geologically is part of the great Alpide belt that extends from the Atlantic Ocean to the Himalaya Mountains. This belt was formed during the Paleogene Period, as the Arabian, African, and Indian continental plates began to collide with the Eurasian plate. This process is still at work today as the African plate converges with the Eurasian plate and the Anatolian plate escapes towards the west and southwest along strike-slip faults. These are the North Anatolian Fault Zone, which forms the present-day plate boundary of Eurasia near the Black Sea coast, and the East Anatolian Fault Zone, which forms part of the boundary of the North Arabian plate in the southeast. As a result, Turkey lies on one of the world's seismically most active regions.

However, many of the rocks exposed in Turkey were formed long before this process began. Turkey contains outcrops of Precambrian rocks, (more than 520 million years old; Bozkurt et al., 2000). The earliest geological history of Turkey is poorly understood, partly because of the problem of reconstructing how the region has been tectonically assembled by plate motions. Turkey can be thought of as a collage of different pieces (possibly terranes) of ancient continental and oceanic lithosphere stuck together by younger igneous, volcanic, and sedimentary rocks.

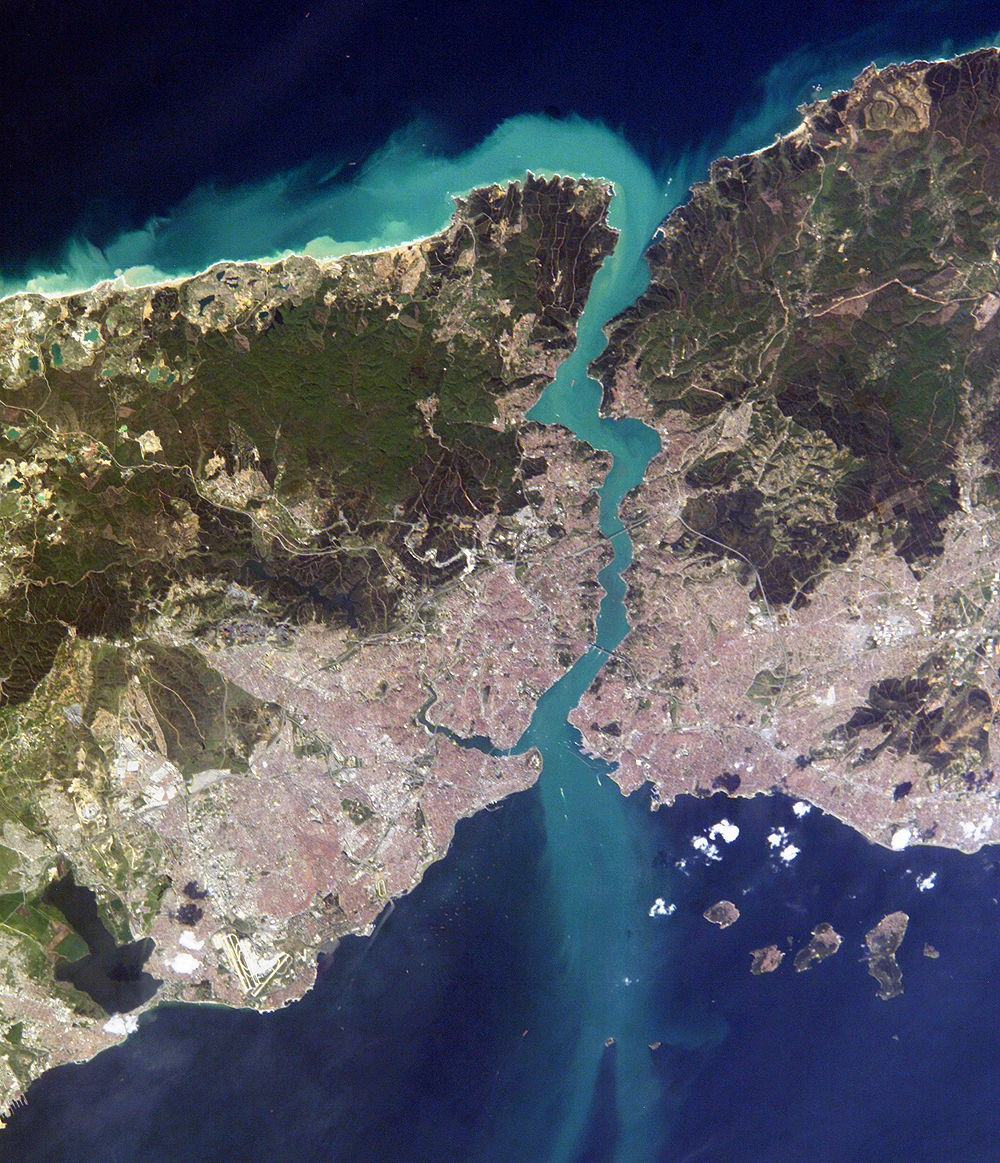
Istanbul and the Bosphorus.

During the Mesozoic era (about 250 to 66 million years ago) a large ocean (Tethys Ocean), floored by oceanic lithosphere existed in-between the supercontinents of Gondwana and Laurasia (which lay to the south and north respectively). This large oceanic plate was consumed at subduction zones (see subduction zone). At the subduction trenches the sedimentary rock layers that were deposited within the prehistoric Tethys Ocean buckled, were folded, faulted, and tectonically mixed with huge blocks of crystalline basement rocks of the oceanic lithosphere. These blocks form a very complex mixture or mélange of rocks that include mainly serpentinite, basalt, dolerite and chert. The Eurasian margin, now preserved in the Pontides (the Pontic Mountains along the Black Sea coast), is thought to have been geologically similar to the Western Pacific region today. Volcanic arcs (see volcanic arc) and backarc basins (see back-arc basin) formed and were emplaced onto Eurasia as ophiolites (see ophiolite) as they collided with microcontinents (literally relatively small plates of continental lithosphere). These microcontinents had been pulled away from the Gondwanan continent further south.

During the Cenozoic folding, faulting, and uplifting, accompanied by volcanic activity and intrusion of igneous rocks was related to major continental collision between the larger Arabian and Eurasian plates.

Present-day earthquakes range from barely perceptible tremors to major movements measuring five or higher on the open-ended Richter scale. Turkey's most severe earthquake in the twentieth century occurred in Erzincan on the night of December 28–29, 1939; it devastated most of the city and caused an estimated 160,000 deaths. Earthquakes of moderate intensity often continue with sporadic aftershocks over periods of several days or even weeks. The most earthquake-prone part of Turkey is an arc-shaped region stretching from the general vicinity of Kocaeli to the area north of Lake Van on the border with Armenia and Georgia.

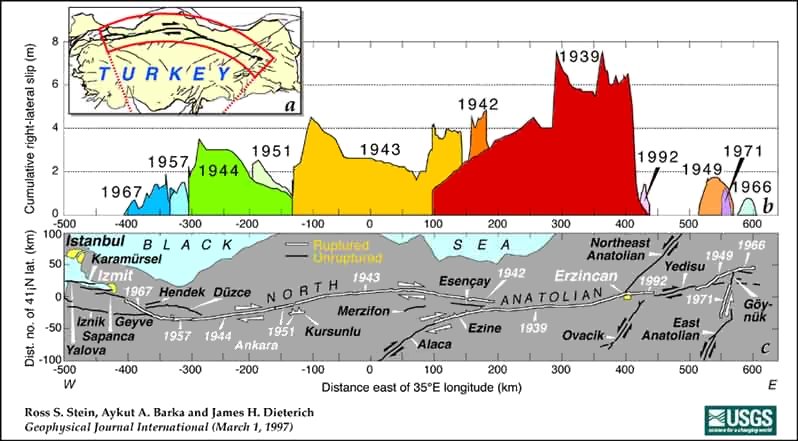
Fault lines and earthquakes.

Turkey's terrain is structurally complex. A central massif composed of uplifted blocks and downfolded troughs, covered by recent deposits and giving the appearance of a plateau with rough terrain, is wedged between two folded mountain ranges that converge in the east. True lowlands are confined to the Ergene Ovası (Ergene Plain) in Thrace, extending along rivers that discharge into the Aegean Sea or the Sea of Marmara, and to a few narrow coastal strips along the Black Sea and Mediterranean Sea coasts.

Nearly 85% of the land is at an elevation of at least 450 meters; the average and median altitude of the country is 1,332 and 1,128 meters, respectively. In Asiatic Turkey, flat or gently sloping land is rare and largely confined to the deltas of the Kızıl River, the coastal plains of Antalya and Adana, and the valley floors of the Gediz River and the Büyükmenderes River, and some interior high plains in Anatolia, mainly around Tuz Gölü (Salt Lake) and Konya Ovası (Konya Plain). Moderately sloping terrain is limited almost entirely outside Thrace to the hills of the Arabian Platform along the border with Syria.

More than 80% of the land surface is rough, broken, and mountainous, and therefore is of limited agricultural value. The terrain's ruggedness is accentuated in the eastern part of the country, where the two mountain ranges converge into a lofty region with a median elevation of more than 1,500 meters, which reaches its highest point along the borders with Armenia, Azerbaijan, and Iran. Turkey's highest peak, Mount Ararat (Ağrı Dağı) – 5,137 meters high – is situated near the point where the boundaries of the four countries meet.

== Background ==
Turkey's terrain is structurally complex. A central massif composed of uplifted blocks and downfolded troughs, covered by recent deposits and giving the appearance of a plateau with rough terrain, is wedged between two folded mountain ranges that converge in the east. True lowland is confined to the plain of the Ergene river in Thrace, extending along rivers that discharge into the Aegean Sea or the Sea of Marmara, and to a few narrow coastal strips along the Black Sea and Mediterranean Sea coasts.

Nearly 85% of the land is at an elevation of at least 450 meters; the median altitude of the country is 1,128 meters. In Asiatic Turkey, flat or gently sloping land is rare and largely confined to the deltas of the Kızıl River, the coastal plains of Antalya and Adana, and the valley floors of the Gediz River and the Büyük Menderes River, and some interior high plains in Anatolia, mainly around Tuz Gölü (Salt Lake) and Konya Ovası (Konya Basin). Moderately sloping terrain is limited almost entirely outside Thrace to the hills of the Arabian Platform along the border with Syria.

More than 80% of the land surface is rough, broken, and mountainous, and therefore is of limited agricultural value. The terrain's ruggedness is accentuated in the eastern part of the country, where the two mountain ranges converge into a lofty region with a median elevation of more than 1,500 meters, which reaches its highest point along the borders with Armenia, Azerbaijan, and Iran. Turkey's highest peak, Mount Ararat (Ağrı Dağı)—about 5,166 meters high—is situated near the point where the boundaries of the four countries meet.

== Geological history ==
The earliest geological history of Turkey is poorly understood, partly because these oldest rocks in the region are involved into younger deformation phases that hindered their evolution. This created problem of reconstructing how the region has been tectonically assembled by plate motions. Turkey can be thought of as a collage of different continental pieces and remnants of oceanic lithospheric rocks amalgamated together by younger tectonic processes that involve accumulation of igneous (both plutonic and volcanic) and sedimentary rocks.

=== Plate tectonics ===
Tectonic plates in Turkey; the Anatolian sub-plate, the African plate, the Arabian plate, and the Eurasian plate.

Except for a relatively small portion of its territory along the Syrian border that is a continuation of the Arabian plate, Turkey geologically is part of the great Alpide belt that extends from the Atlantic Ocean to the Himalaya Mountains. This belt was formed during the Cenozoic Era (about 66 to 1.6 million years ago), as the Arabian, African, and Indian continental plates began to collide with the Eurasian plate. This process is still at work today as the African plate converges with the Eurasian plate and the Anatolian sub-plate escapes towards the west and southwest along strike-slip faults. These are the North Anatolian Fault Zone, which forms the present day plate boundary of Eurasia near the Black Sea coast and, the East Anatolian Fault Zone, which forms part of the boundary of the North Arabian plate in the southeast. As a result of this plate tectonics configuration, Turkey is one of the world's more active earthquake and volcanic regions.

The Anatolian plate, together with the Aegean-Peloponnesus block, is located near the centre of a very wide region, including the Arabian plate with the adjacent Zagros Mountains and central Iran, that moves in a circulatory pattern at a relatively fast rate of 20 mm/yr. The rate of this counter-clockwise motion increases near the Hellenic Trench system south of Turkey and decreases away from it (i.e. the Eurasian and African plates move at a rate of 5 mm/yr), resulting in internal deformations in several areas, including central and eastern Anatolia, south-western Aegean-Peloponnesus, Lesser Caucasus, and central Iran. The dominant process in the region is the subduction of the African plate beneath the Hellenic Trench, and the deformation in the entire African-Arabian-Eurasian collision zone is most likely driven by the slab roll-back of the subducting African plate in the East Mediterranean. This process is further fuelled by slab-pull forces in the Makran Trench in the Gulf of Oman where the Arabian plate is subducting under Eurasia. A response to this tectonic maelstrom is the rifting in the Red Sea and Gulf of Aden which will separate Arabia from Africa.

The tomography of the velocity propagation distributions of the P__{n} seismic waves both in an isotropic and anisotropic conditions, compared with the lateral variations of that velocity has highlighted the physical properties of the uppermost mantle and crustal thickness of the Earth. A study analyzed 700 earthquakes occurred in Turkey from 1999 to 2010 with magnitude degree major than 4.0 and the related 50.000 Pn first arrivals recorded by 832 seismic stations at a distance range of 180–1500 km from the epicenter. The tomography highlighted that "Pn velocities are found to be lowest in eastern Turkey (<7.6 km s-1) and highest in the eastern Mediterranean Sea and Zagros Suture (>8.3 km s-1). Large Pn anisotropy is observed in the Aegean, central Anatolia and along the southern coast of Anatolia. [...] Large crustal thicknesses are observed along the Dinarides-Hellenides and along the southern coast of Anatolia."

=== Rocks ===
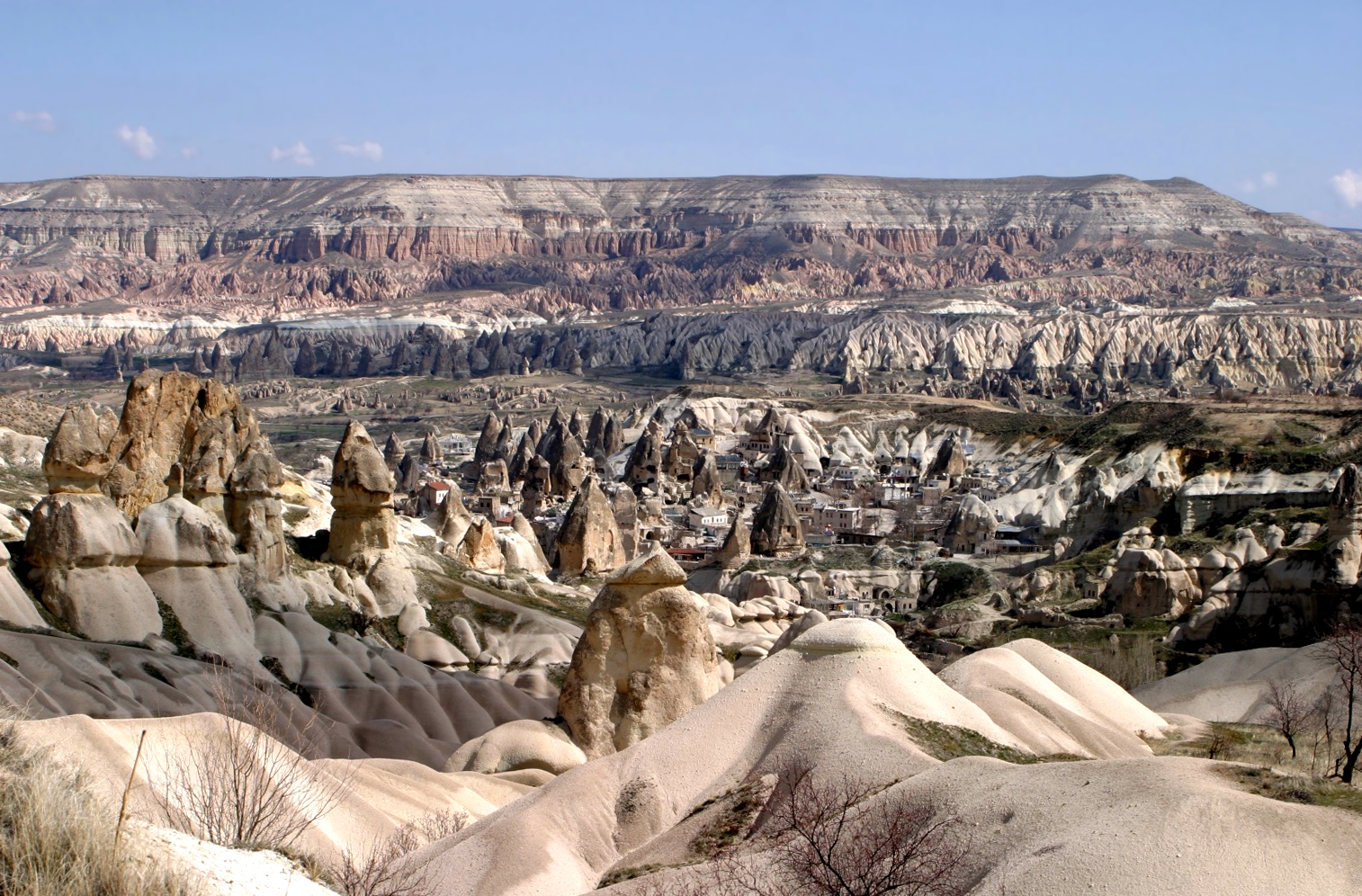
View of Cappadocia landscape.

Many of the rocks exposed in Turkey were formed long before this process began. Turkey contains outcrops of Precambrian rocks, (more than 540 million years old).

During the Mesozoic era (about 250 to 66 million years ago) a large ocean (Tethys Ocean), floored by oceanic lithosphere existed in-between the supercontinents of Gondwana and Laurasia (which lay to the south and north respectively). This large oceanic plate was consumed at subduction zones. At the subduction trenches the sedimentary rock layers that were deposited within the prehistoric Tethys Ocean were folded, faulted and tectonically mixed with huge blocks of crystalline basement rocks of the oceanic lithosphere. These blocks form a very complex mixture or mélange of rocks that include mainly serpentinite, basalt, dolerite, and chert. The Eurasian margin, now preserved in the Pontides (the Pontic Mountains along the Black Sea coast), is thought to have been geologically similar to the Western Pacific region today. Volcanic arcs and back-arc basins formed and were emplaced onto Eurasia as ophiolites as they collided with microcontinents (literally relatively small plates of continental lithosphere). These microcontinents had been pulled away from the Gondwanan continent further south. Turkey is therefore made up from several different prehistorical microcontinents.

During the Cenozoic (Tertiary about 66 to 1.6 million years) folding, faulting and uplifting, accompanied by volcanic activity and intrusion of igneous rocks was related to major continental collision between the larger Arabian and Eurasian plates. Pamukkale terraces are made of travertine, a sedimentary rock deposited by mineral water from hot springs. The area is famous for a carbonate mineral left by the flowing of thermal spring water.

== Earthquakes ==
Turkey's most severe earthquake in the twentieth century occurred in Erzincan on the night of 1939-12-27; it devastated most of the city and caused an estimated 30,000 deaths. Earthquakes of moderate intensity often continue with sporadic aftershocks over periods of several days or even weeks. Seismicity in Turkey is more likely to happen in the North Anatolian Fault Zone, East Anatolian Fault Zone and in the subduction region of the Aegean Plate between the Anatolian plate.

== See also ==
- List of earthquakes in Turkey
- Soil in Turkey

== Sources ==
- Bergougnan, H. (1975) Dispositif des ophiolites nord-est anatoliennes, origine des nappes ophiolitiques et sud-pontiques, jeu de la faille nord-anatolienne. Comptes Rendus de l'Académie des Sciences, Série D: Sciences Naturelles, 281: 107–110.
- Bozkurt, E. and Satir, M. (2000) The southern Menderes Massif (western Turkey); geochronology and exhumation history. Geological Journal, 35: 285–296.
- Kaymakci, N., 2000. Tectono-stratigraphical evolution of the Çankırı basin (Central Anatolia, Turkey) (Vol. 190, pp. 1–247). Utrecht University.
- Kaymakci, N., Inceöz, M., Ertepinar, P. and Koç, A. 2010. Cretaceous to recent kinematics of SE Anatolia (Turkey) In Sosson, M. Kaymakci, N., Stephenson, R., Starostenko, V. and Bergerat, F. (Eds.) Sedimentary basin tectonics from the Black Sea and Caucasus to the Arabian Platform. Geological Society London Special Issue No. 340, 409–435.
- Reilinger, Robert; McClusky, Simon; Vernant, Philippe; Lawrence, Shawn; Ergintav, Semih; Cakmak, Rahsan (May 2006). "GPS constraints on continental deformation in the Africa-Arabia-Eurasia continental collision zone and implications for the dynamics of plate interactions: EASTERN MEDITERRANEAN ACTIVE TECTONICS". Journal of Geophysical Research: Solid Earth. 111 (B5). Bibcode:2006JGRB..111.5411R. doi:10.1029/2005JB004051.
- Robertson, A. and Dixon, J.E.D. (1984) Introduction: aspects of the geological evolution of the Eastern Mediterranean. In: Dixon and Robertson (Editors), The Geological Evolution of the Eastern Mediterranean. Geological Society, London, Special Publications, 17, 1–74.
- Ustaömer, T. and Robertson, A. (1997) Tectonic-sedimentary evolution of the north Tethyan margin in the Central Pontides of northern Turkey. In: A.G. Robinson (Editor), Regional and Petroleum Geology of the Black Sea and Surrounding Region. AAPG Memoir, 68, Tulsa, Oklahoma, 255–290.
