= Mount Erciyes =

Volcano in Turkey

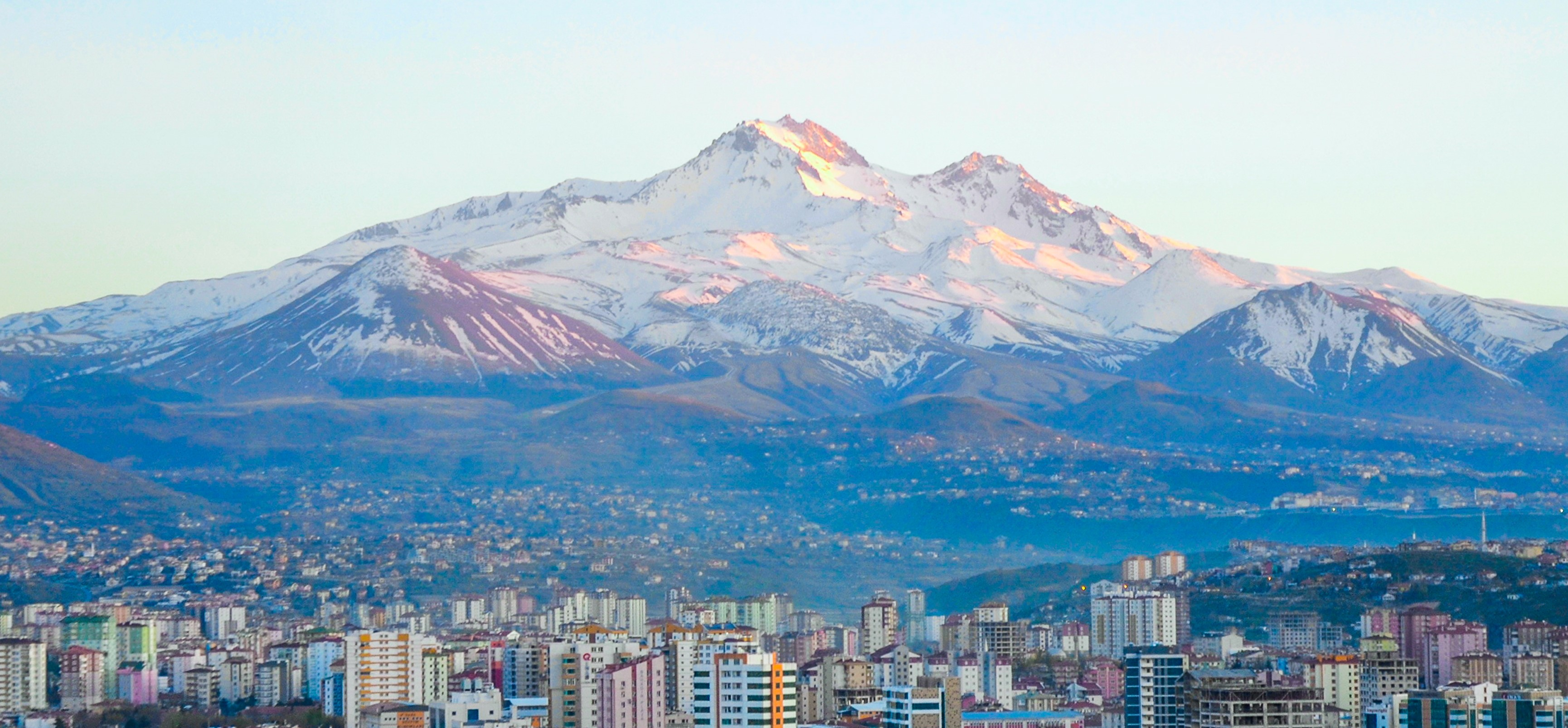
- View of Mount Erciyes from Kayseri

Highest point
- Elevation: 3,917 m (12,851 ft)
- Prominence: 2,419 m (7,936 ft)
- Listing: Ultra
- Coordinates: 38°31′52″N 35°26′49″E

Geography
- Location within Turkey
- Location: Kayseri Province, Turkey

Geology
- Mountain type: Stratovolcano
- Last eruption: 6880 BCE ± 40 years

Mount Erciyes (Turkish: Erciyes Dağı) is an inactive volcano in Kayseri Province, Turkey. It is a large stratovolcano surrounded by many monogenetic vents and lava domes, and one maar. The bulk of the volcano is formed by lava flows of andesitic and dacitic composition. At some time in the past, part of the summit collapsed towards the east.

The volcano began to form in the Miocene. At first, a volcano farther east named Koç Dağ formed from lava flows. Then, again to the east, large explosive eruptions formed a caldera. During the Pleistocene, Mount Erciyes proper grew inside the caldera together with a group of lava domes. Lateral eruptions of Erciyes may have generated ash layers in the Black Sea and the Mediterranean during the early Holocene.

The last eruptions occurred during the early Holocene and may have deposited ash as far away as Palestine; the occurrence of historical volcanism is uncertain. Future eruptions of Erciyes may endanger the nearby cities to the north. The volcano was glaciated during the Pleistocene. One regular glacier still exists, but is receding.

== Etymology and mythology ==
Erciyes is the adoption into Turkish of the Greek name Argaios (Greek: Ἀργαῖος). The Latinized form is Argaeus; a rarely encountered alternative latinization was Argaeas mons, Argeas mons. The Greek name has the meaning of "bright" or "white"; as applied to the mountain, it may have been eponymous of Argaeus I (678 – 640 BC), king of Macedon and founder of the Argead dynasty.

The Turkish name was historically spelled Erciyas, and it was changed to Erciyes to conform with vowel harmony in the 1940s–1960s. Mons Argaeus on the Moon was named for Argaeus. The mountain and associated god Aškašipa mentioned in Assyrian sources, and "Mount Harhara" of Bronze Age and Iron Age inscriptions in Anatolia may be Erciyes.

Several myths refer to the mountain. The tale of Cis Hatun features the eponymous daughter of a local chief and her lover. The chief agreed that the lover could have her if he slayed the fire-breathing dragon on Mount Erciyes; he set out over her objections, she tried to stop him and they were both burned alive. Cis Hatun brought her wedding dress to the mountain, where it remained and forms Erciyes' permanent snow cover.

== Geology and geomorphology ==
Erciyes lies in the Kayseri Province of Turkey. The city of Kayseri lies 15 kilometres (9.3 mi)-25 kilometres (16 mi) north of Erciyes volcano; some lava domes generated by the volcano are within the urban limits. Other towns in the region are Talas and Hacilar, also north of Erciyes but closer to the volcano (19 kilometres (12 mi) and 12 kilometres (7.5 mi), respectively), Develi, located south, and İncesu, located west and southwest of the volcano. Access to the summit area is difficult. Climbers in antiquity reported that both the Black Sea and the Mediterranean could be seen from the summit.

=== Regional ===
Mount Erciyes and Mount Hasan are both large stratovolcanoes that lie in Central Anatolia, on the Anatolian Plate. This microplate is part of the collision zone between the Eurasian Plate, the African Plate, and the Arabian Plate that forms the Alpide Belt. This convergence commenced in the Miocene and formed the Anatolian block, with two oceans that existed between these three plates in the Eocene disappearing through subduction. During the late Miocene, the Neo-Tethys ocean disappeared, and Africa and Eurasia collided. Later, the Red Sea and the Gulf of Suez separated the Arabian Plate from the African Plate, causing the former to collide with Eurasia and forming the Bitlis–Zagros Belt. The Anatolian block was pushed westward between the North Anatolian and East Anatolian faults, and it is still moving today.

In central Anatolia, volcanism commenced in the Miocene. After an effusive phase and the eruption of large ignimbrite sheets, volcanoes developed, including stratovolcanoes such as Erciyes and Hasan on the one hand and monogenetic volcanoes and maars (Note: Maars are small volcanoes formed by phreatomagmatic activity that excavates country rock.) on the other hand. The tectonic environment has been compared with the Basin and Range Province. The Central Anatolian Volcanic Province, of which Erciyes is a part, covers a surface area of 32,500 square kilometres (12,500 sq mi). The Cappadocian volcanic plateau comprises ignimbrites that are up to 2 kilometres (1.2 mi) thick. The youngest K–Ar dates obtained on these centres are 60,000 ± 20,000 years ago for the Kizirtepe monogenetic centres and 20,000 ± 10,000 for Hasan. Volcanic activity in the Acıgöl-Nevşehir system has been fission track dated at 15,500 ± 2,500 years ago.

Major faults such as the North Anatolian Fault, which were generated by the convergence, are also active. Some of these faults form the edges of the Erciyes pull-apart basin, a tectonic depression up to 1.2 kilometres (0.75 mi) deep that is split by this volcano into the Sultansazlıği and Kayseri-Sarımsaklı basins, both of which nevertheless are part of the same system. These margin faults have been the source of earthquakes during historical times, resulting in damage to cities in the region, and ongoing extension of this crustal domain is the probable reason for volcanism at Erciyes.

=== Local ===
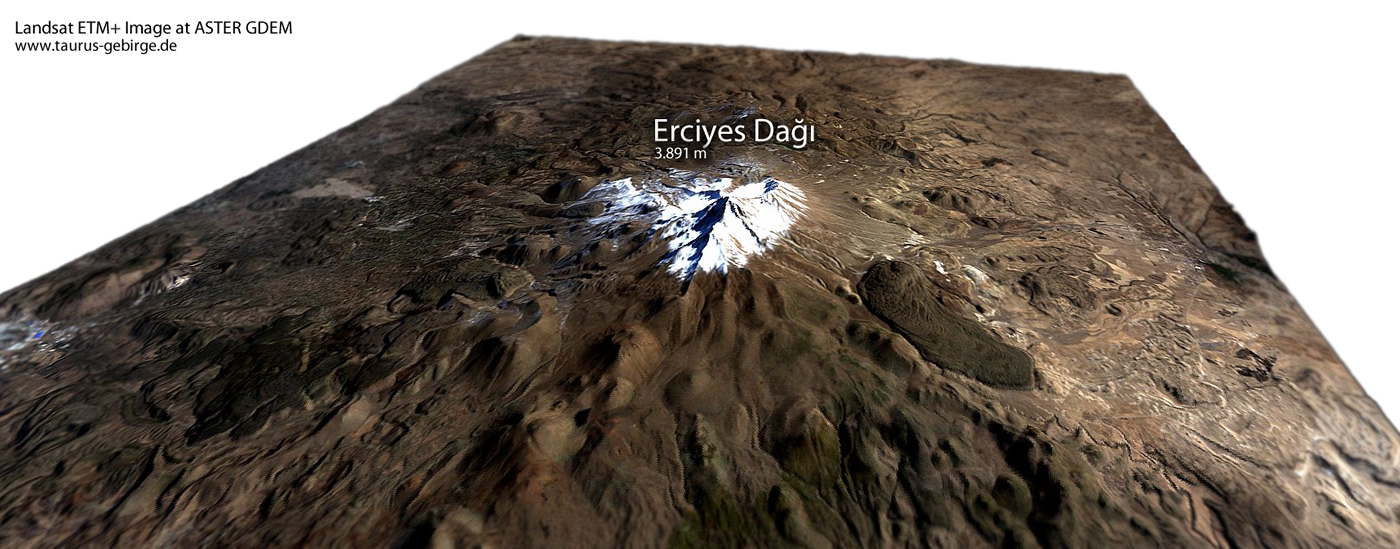
3D image of Erciyes

Erciyes is a large stratovolcano, reaching a height of 3,864 metres (12,677 ft), 3,918 metres (12,854 ft) or 3,917 metres (12,851 ft), making it the highest mountain and most voluminous volcano of Central Anatolia. It rises about 900 metres (3,000 ft) above the Sultansazlıği basin and 2,842 metres (9,324 ft) above the floor of the Erciyes pull-apart basin.

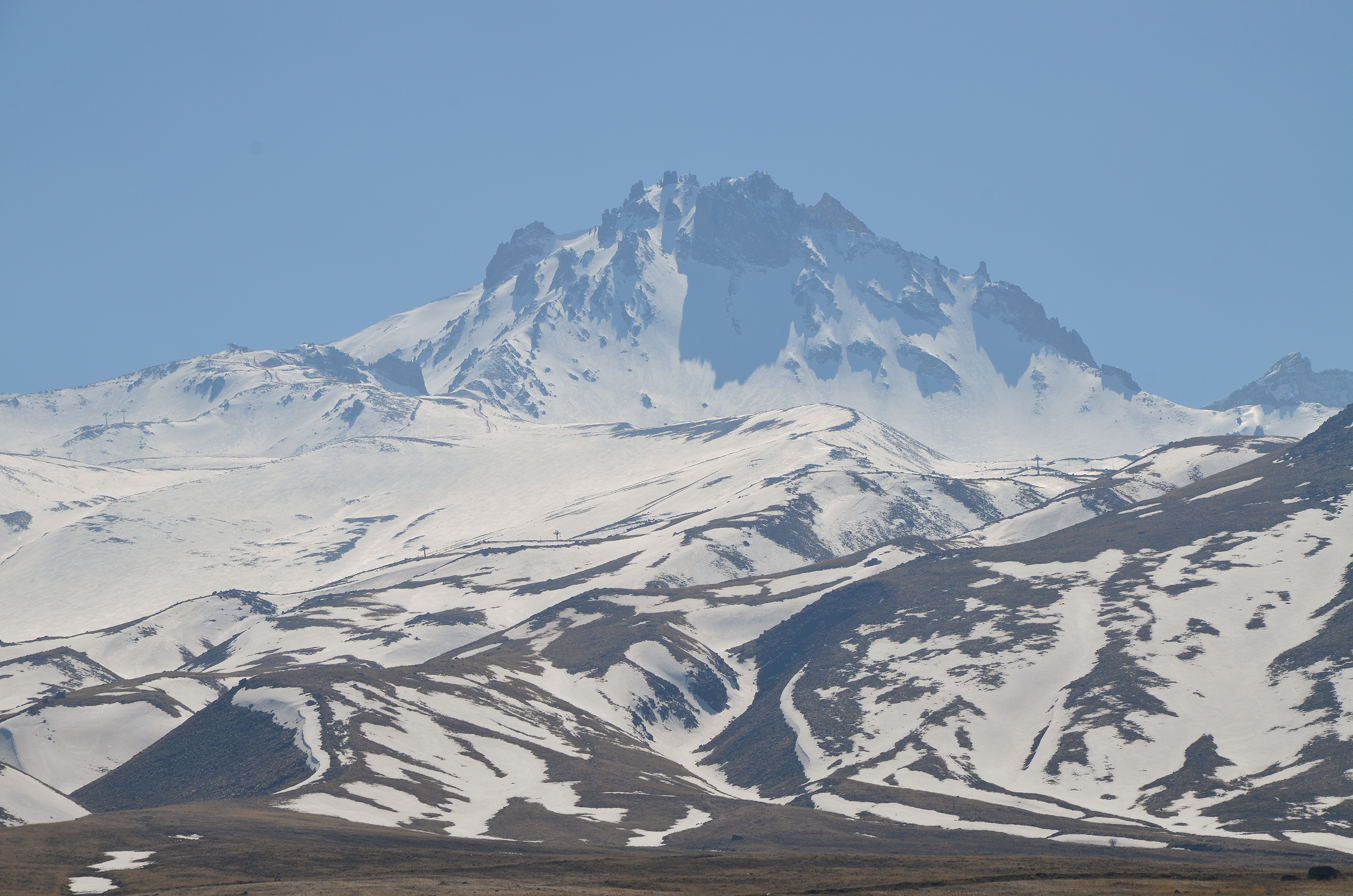
View of the summit

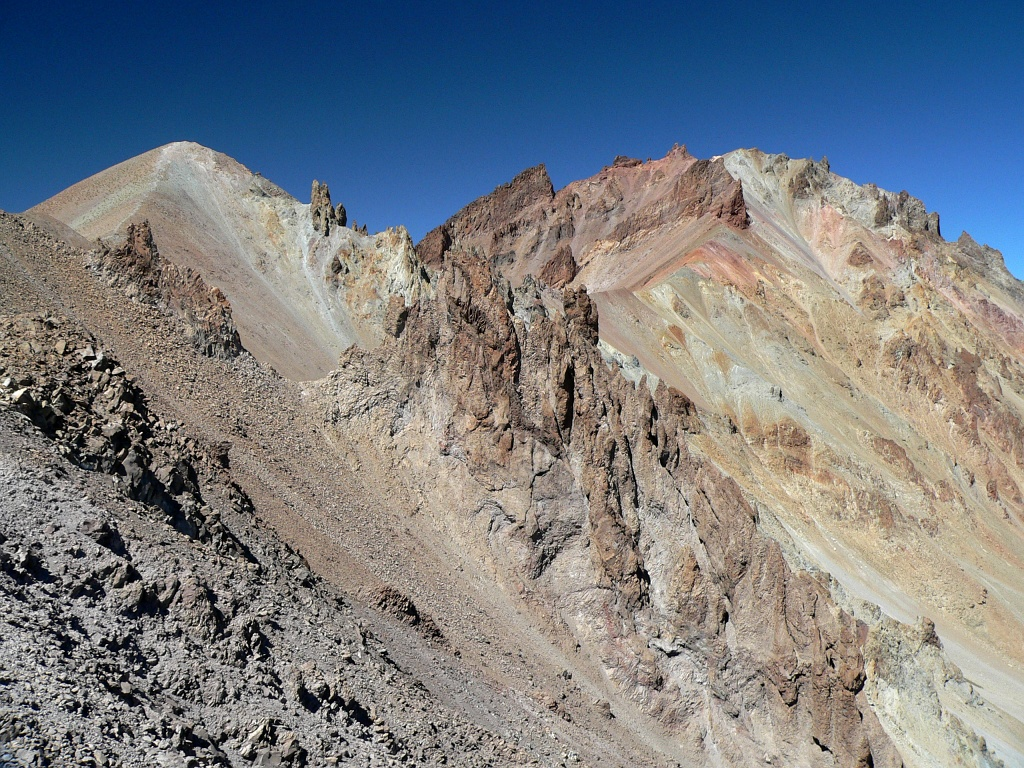
Close-up view of the summit

The volcano is large, it covers a surface area of 1,300 square kilometres (500 sq mi) or 3,300 square kilometres (1,300 sq mi). It developed over a broad shield, and dacitic domes and flows form the bulk of the volcano's exposed units, including the summit area, where several lava flows have been identified. Lava flows of Erciyes extend both from the summit and from lateral vents. A debris avalanche extending east-northeast from Erciyes was formed by the collapse of the summit, creating a 2-kilometre (1.2 mi) wide horseshoe-shaped scar that forms the upper segment of the Üçker valley. The debris avalanche deposit reaches a distance of 7 kilometres (4.3 mi) from the summit and has a hummocky appearance. The volcano consists of lava flows, pyroclastic flows and volcanic ash and has an eroded appearance.

Two major valleys extend to the summit, the northwesterly Aksu Valley and the easterly Üçker valley. The minor valleys of Öksüzdere lie north, Topaktaş south, and Saraycık southwest of the summit. The Aksu valley contains sizable moraines left by the Pleistocene glaciation that are up to 60 metres (200 ft) high, 60–120 metres (200–390 ft) wide and 1–2.5 kilometres (0.62–1.55 mi) long. A glacial outwash plain formed at the valley foot and was partly buried by Karagüllü lavas. Moraines and outwash plains are heavily eroded.

Andesite and basaltic andesites are exposed on the western, southern, and eastern sides of the volcano; on the eastern side they form the Koç Dağ centre with a height of 2,628 metres (8,622 ft). This centre is mostly formed by lava flows. On the western side, andesitic lava flows reach the Sultansazlıği basin. The huge middle Pleistocene Aliboran lava flow descended the western slopes and blocked the Incesu valley, forming Aliboran Lake in the basin. The lake was fed by glacial meltwater from Erciyes and later overflowed the lava flow at several sites, the most important of which is Çalbama Gediģi. This overflow was not continuous; phases of lower lake levels caused it to dry up. Today, the basin contains wetlands that are protected under the Ramsar Convention and are a major nesting site for migratory birds.

Endogenous domes extend from Erciyes, and 184, 210, or 64 individual centres dot its flanks. The domes have diameters of 1–4 kilometres (0.62–2.49 mi), and formed along radial dykes. A number of such domes and centres formed on the rim of the 14-by-18-kilometre (8.7 by 11.2 mi) wide caldera in which Erciyes sits and which formed during the Valibaba Tepe eruption. This caldera may originally have had a volume of 110 cubic kilometres (26 cu mi). Clockwise from north, these volcanic centres are Ali Dağ, Kızıl Tepe, Topakkaya Tepe, Dikkartin Dağ, Kolanlı Dağ, Göğdağ, Yılband Dağ, Cora Maar, Karagüllü Dağ, Yılanlı Dağ, Carık Tepe, Perikartın and Lifos Tepe. About half of these centres are at distances of about 10 kilometres (6.2 mi) from Erciyes, and most of them can be found on the northern slopes. Of these centres, 1,200 metres (3,900 ft) wide and 100 metres (330 ft) deep Cora Maar lies 20 kilometres (12 mi) northwest of Erciyes. It formed within Quaternary andesite lava flows; its formation was probably favoured by a shallow aquifer and was accompanied by strong phreatomagmatic explosions. The formation of this maar was accompanied by the release of tephra, which reached a distance of 3.5 kilometres (2.2 mi). Additional basaltic vents are Abas Tepe, Karniyarik Tepe, Kefeli Dag, and Siharslan Tepe.

From the more recent volcanic phases, Dikkartin Dağ and Perikartın lava domes lie on the southern and northern slope of Erciyes, respectively. Both domes are formed of rhyodacite and accompanied by pyroclastic deposits. Dikkartin Dağ covers a surface area of 11.7 square kilometres (4.5 sq mi) and reaches a height of 2,760 metres (9,060 ft). The blocky dome flowed down the slopes southwards over 5 kilometres (3.1 mi). Karagüllü on the north-northwestern flank stratigraphically belongs to the same unit as Dikkartin Dağ. This dome flowed for a distance of about 5 kilometres (3.1 mi).

The volcano lies in a tectonic depression. It is cut by the Ecemiş fault, which together with the Tuz Gölü fault border this basin. Other faults converge on the volcano or pass through its outer slopes. Aeromagnetic investigation of the region has evidenced the existence of a magnetic anomaly associated with Erciyes, which is probably caused by the volcanism, and magnetotelluric analysis has identified magma storage zones at various depths of the volcano.

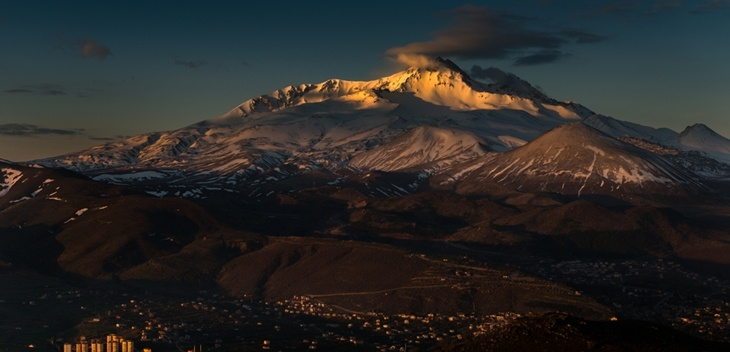

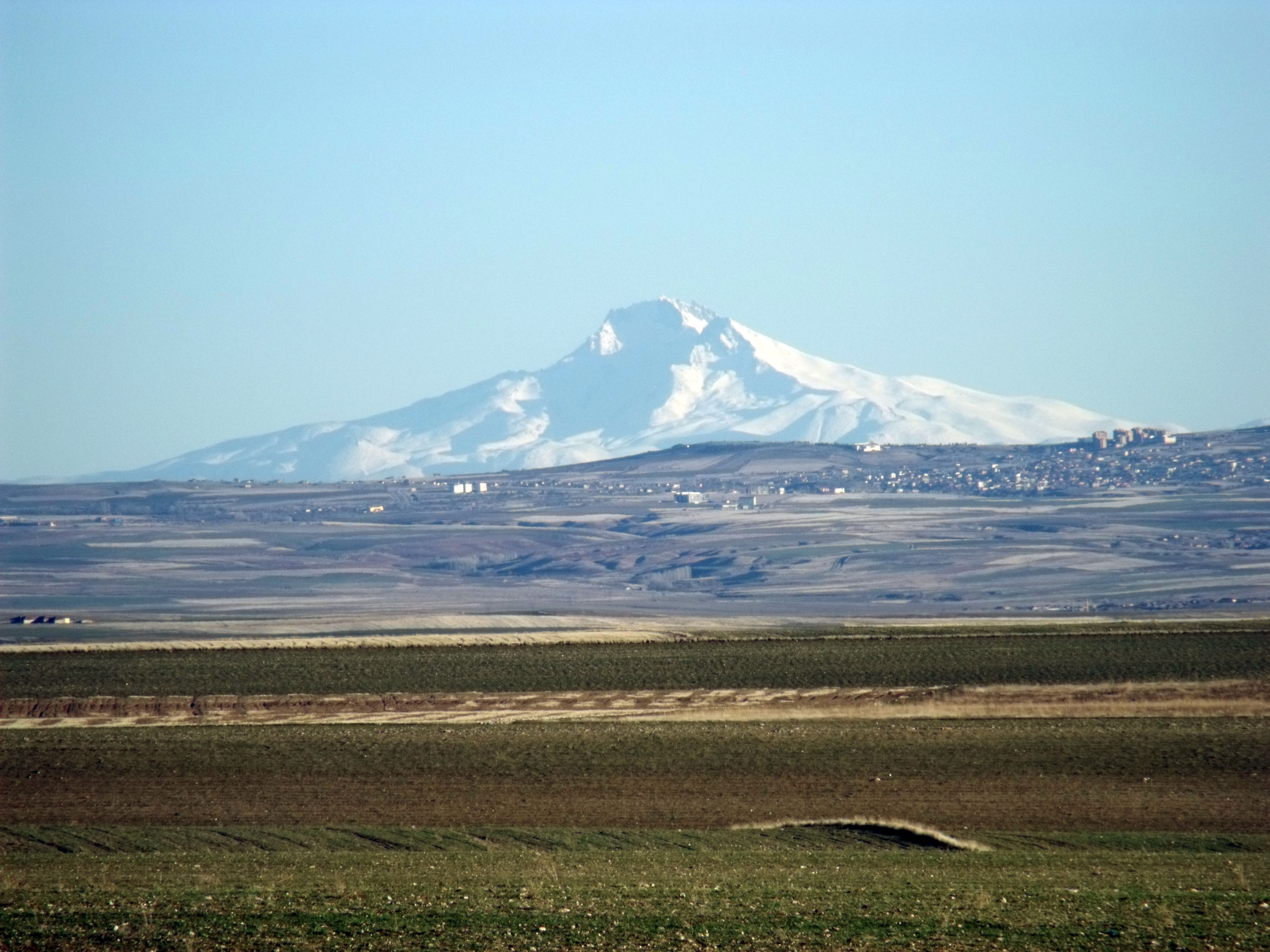

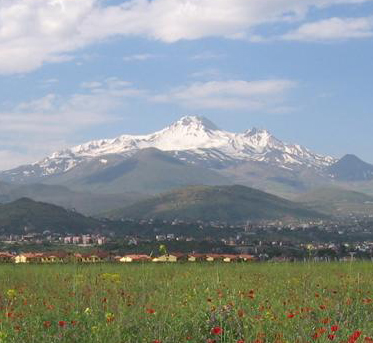

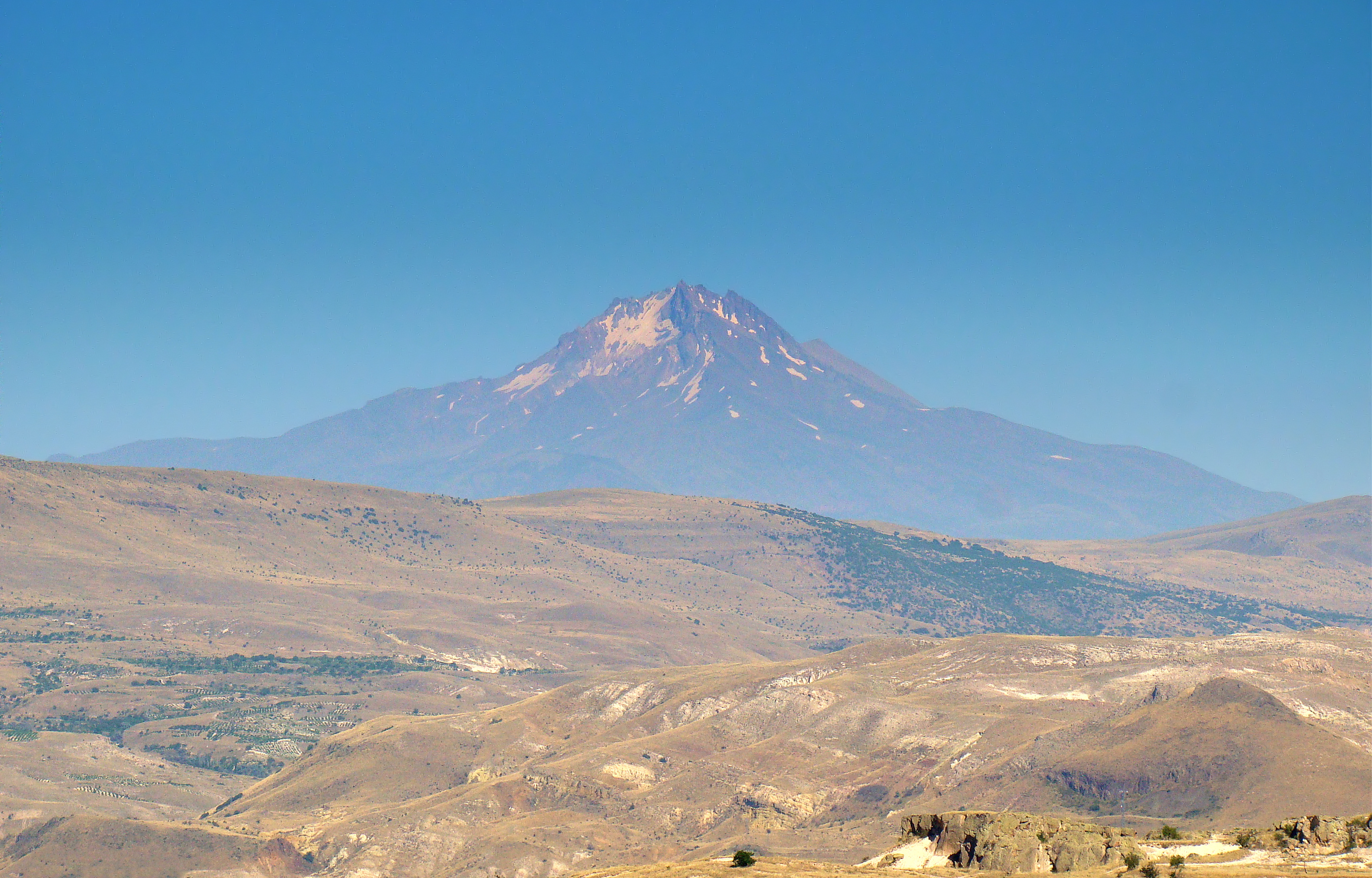

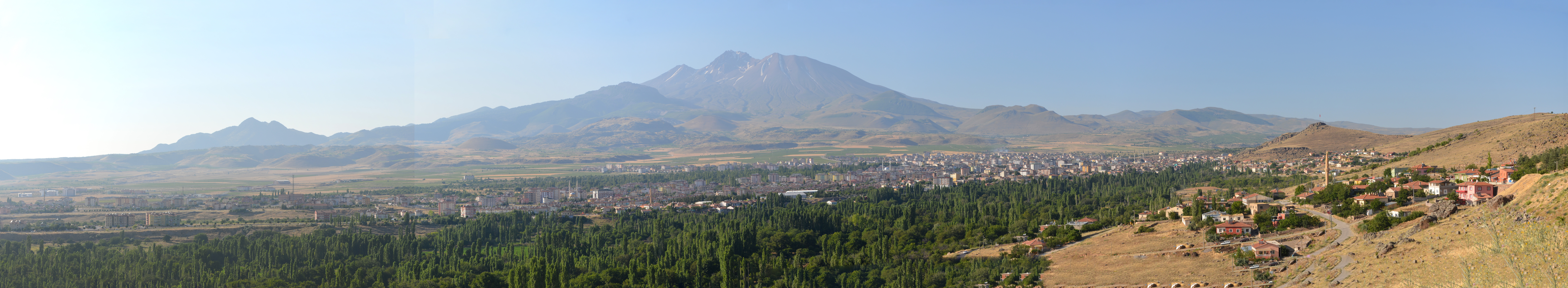

=== Petrology ===
Erciyes has erupted basalt, basaltic andesite, andesite, dacite, rhyodacite, and rhyolite. The rocks are chiefly andesite with smaller amounts of dacite; dacites appear to dominate in the summit region, however. The volcano is dominated by calc-alkaline rocks; one basalt with tholeiitic to intermediary affinity was erupted 1.7 million years ago; volcanic activity at first was tholeiitic and later became calc-alkaline. Monogenetic volcanoes in the region also erupted basalt, but this basalt is clearly different from the Erciyes basalt.

Minerals contained in Erciyes rocks include clinopyroxene, ilmenite, orthopyroxene, plagioclase, and titanomagnetite. Samples taken from the summit also contain amphibole, apatite, biotite, feldspar, quartz, and zircon. The mineral yazganite was first described from samples obtained on Mount Erciyes, and its chemical formula is NaFe_{2}(Mg,Mn)(AsO_{4})_{3}·H_{2}O.

The dacites taken from the summit display a noticeable variability in their composition and texture, with their temperatures at formation varying between 734–989 °C (1,353–1,812 °F).

The andesites and dacites may have formed from basaltic magma by fractional crystallization involving amphibole, based on elemental composition data. Further, crustal materials were included into the magma. Tholeiitic and calc-alkaline magmas have different elemental compositions and probably formed from separate sources; tholeiitic magmas may have formed from partial melting of the mantle, while the calc-alkaline magmas formed from crustal assimilation in these magmas. Overall, the magma originated in the asthenospheric mantle; lithospheric components may have contributed, however.

Volcanism appears to be associated with crustal extension at Erciyes. Mantle metasomatism from a subducting slab, on the other hand, may or may not have played a major role, and the slab itself did not reach down below Central Anatolia, meaning that subduction probably is not responsible for Central Anatolian volcanism.

== Climate and biology ==
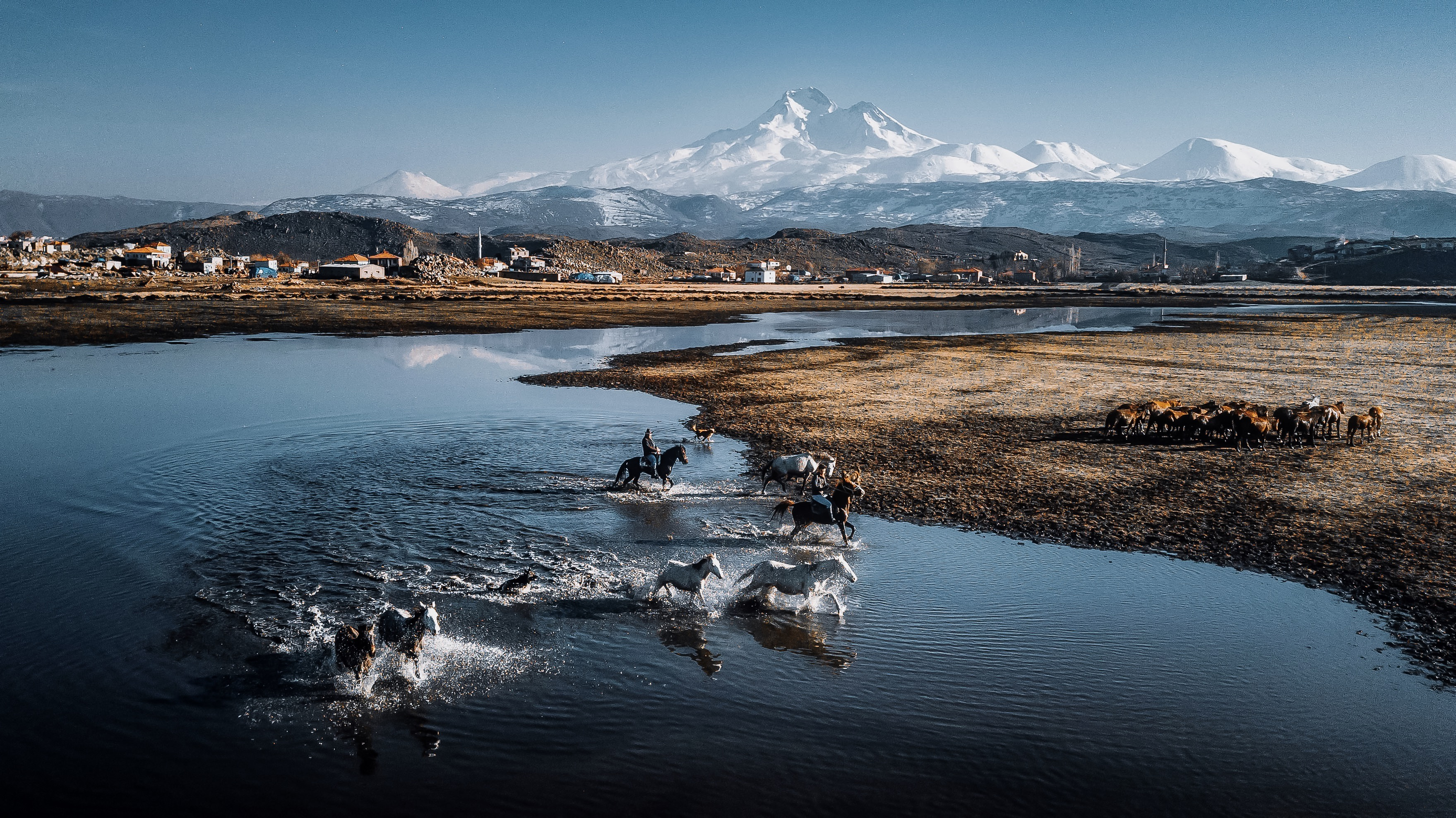
Wild horses at Mount Erciyes

The climate of the region is influenced by topography, with the Taurus and Kaçkar Mountains blocking the entry of moisture into Anatolia. Summers are dry and hot and winters snowy and cold; in Kayseri, summer temperatures are about 19 °C (66 °F) and winter temperature about 0 °C (32 °F). Precipitation at Kayseri falls mostly in autumn, winter, and spring and amounts to 383 millimetres (15.1 in) per year. In Develi, south of Erciyes, maximum temperatures are about 29.5 °C (85.1 °F) and minimum temperatures −5.6 °C (21.9 °F). Estimated temperatures at 2,700 metres (8,900 ft) altitude are about −0.4 °C (31.3 °F), and precipitation 722 millimetres (28.4 in) per year. Groundwater under Kayseri is recharged from the mountain. During the Last Glacial Maximum, precipitation may have been double that of present-day.

Four vegetation belts surround the mountain: a boreal belt, a subalpine, an alpine, and a subnival belt. The boreal belt extends between 1,100–2,100 metres (3,600–6,900 ft) while the subalpine belt goes from 2,100–2,800 metres (6,900–9,200 ft) elevation and the alpine from 2,800–3,400 metres (9,200–11,200 ft). Species found in the vegetation belts are different from these found in the equivalent areas of Western European mountains.

The flora of Erciyes is diverse. A number of endemic plant species have been identified, including Astragalus argaeus, Astragalus stenosemioides, Asyneuma trichostegium, Bellardiochloa argaea, Dianthus crinitus argaeus, Festuca cratericola, Festuca woronowii argaea, Hieracium argaeum, Onobrychis argaea, and Vicia canescens argaea. The plant Silene erciyesdaghensis was discovered on Erciyes and named after it. The geographer Strabo claimed that, in antiquity, the volcano was forested. A number of endemic and relic animal species can also be found at Erciyes, as well as a rich lichen flora. Grazing, settlements, and tourism have altered the natural vegetation of the mountain.

== Glaciation ==
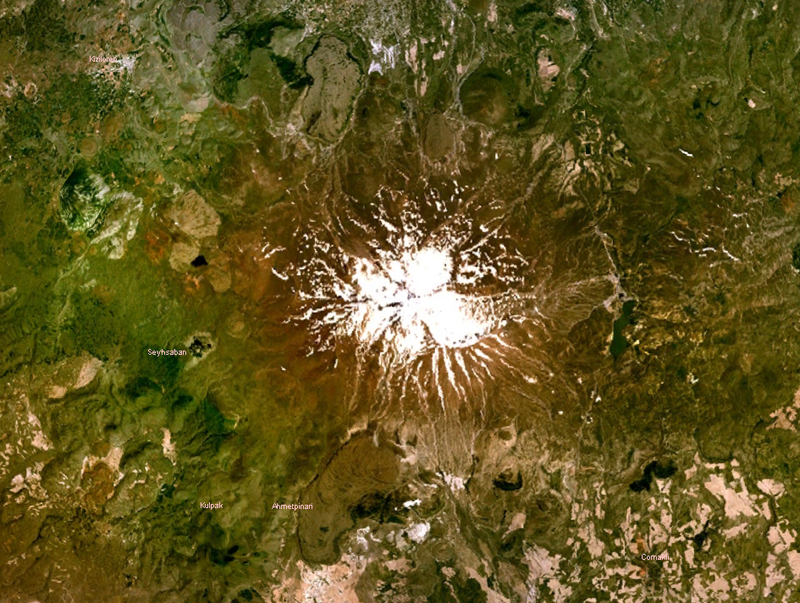
Erciyes, covered with snow

The volcano was glaciated during the Pleistocene, during which about three stages of glaciation occurred. Aretes, cirques, horns, and moraines from these glaciations can be found on the volcano, with each of the five valleys that extend from the summit hosting glaciers. In the Aksu valley, these extended down to an altitude of 2,150 metres (7,050 ft). Glaciers reached lengths of 6 kilometres (3.7 mi); with the Aksu valley glacier reaching a length of 5.8 kilometres (3.6 mi) and the Üçker glacier of 4.5 kilometres (2.8 mi). The snowline was 950 metres (3,120 ft) lower during the Last Glacial Maximum, probably due to a wetter climate. Chlorine-36 dating has yielded ages corresponding to the last glacial maximum and late glacial for the principal moraines in Aksu valley. A late Holocene glacial advance extended down to 3,850 metres (12,630 ft); dating of these moraines has yielded ages of 1,200 ± 300 years ago. In the Üçker valley, the lowermost moraines are found at an altitude of 2,200 metres (7,200 ft), with the late Holocene advance forming moraines at an altitude of 3,250 metres (10,660 ft). The maximum extent of glaciers on Erciyes occurred 21,300 ± 900 years ago, when glaciers reached lengths of 6 kilometres (3.7 mi). Glacier retreat occurred 20,700 ± 2,200 - 20,400 ± 1,800 years ago in the two catchments. Smaller advances and retreats occurred 14,600 ± 1,200 and 9,300 ± 1,500 years ago. The glaciers expanded last 3,800 ± 400 years ago; there is no clear evidence of a Little Ice Age glacier expansion. Later glacial advances mostly correspond to these estimated for other Mediterranean glaciers. Meltwater from these glaciers nourished a now-gone lake in the Sultansazlıği basin.

During antiquity, the summit was always covered with snow. Glacial ice is still found on the northwestern slope of Erciyes, in the Aksu Valley at altitudes of 2,900–3,200 metres (9,500–10,500 ft). It has a volume of about 1,000,000 cubic metres (35,000,000 cu ft) at a minimum. A report from 1905 says that the glacier was 700 metres (2,300 ft) long. In 2009 the glacier was 260 metres (850 ft) long and in 2011 an area of 0.05 square kilometres (0.019 sq mi) was reported; it is actively retreating and, assuming that the pace of retreat does not change, it will be gone by 2070. This is the westernmost glacier in Turkey today; other glaciers are found in the Kaçkar Mountains at the Black Sea, Mount Cilo in southeastern Turkey, and on Ararat. Block streams and rock glaciers developed during the Holocene, the Üçker valley hosts a rock glacier with a surface area of 1 square kilometre (0.39 sq mi).

== Eruptive history ==
A number of potassium–argon dates have been obtained for Erciyes, ranging from 2.59 ± 0.1 million years ago to 80,000 ± 10,000 years ago. Some stratigraphic units from Erciyes have been dated. Early volcanic activity occurred at the same time as the initial formation of the Erciyes basin. Since about 88,000 - 85,000 years ago, the average magma production rate has been about 0.1 cubic kilometres per millennium (0.024 mi^{3}/ka), with a long-term flux about four times larger.

The oldest volcanic activity at Erciyes is known as Koç Dağ, which forms the eastern slope of Erciyes. This complex erupted pyroxene andesite, 15 kilometres (9.3 mi) long lava flows from Topakkaya Tepe cone and 0.2 cubic kilometres (0.048 cu mi) dense rock equivalent of fall deposits and scoria from Kızıl Tepe. One date obtained on Koç Dağ is 4.39 ± 0.28 million years ago. Overall, Koç Dağ was active between 4.4 and 2.9 million years ago.

Caldera-forming activity occurred in several eruption phases, accompanied by pumice flows and ash fall. A first phase of activity formed Plinian deposits that reach thicknesses of 22 metres (72 ft) as far as 21 kilometres (13 mi) from the volcano, covering at least 3,000 kilometres (1,900 mi) of surface. At least fifteen individual layers have been found. A second phase of activity formed pumice flows east-northeast of Koç Dağ, covering 2,100 square kilometres (810 sq mi) to a thickness of 8 metres (26 ft).

Eastern Cappadocia features the famous Cappadocian ignimbrites; one of these ignimbrites, the Valibaba Tepe ignimbrite (also known as İncesu Ignimbrite), was linked to Erciyes volcano and is the last Cappadocian ignimbrite. This eruption 2.8 million years ago has a total volume of 52 cubic kilometres (12 cu mi) and was preceded by a smaller Plinian eruption that covered a surface of 1,500 square kilometres (580 sq mi) with pumice falls. The Valibaba Tepe ignimbrite extends east of the Erciyes volcano; it originated there and filled in the previous topography. Its total volume has been estimated at 146 cubic kilometres (35 cu mi), and it contains a large proportion of fiammes. Changes in magma composition from the first phase of caldera-forming activity to the Valibaba Tepe pumice may reflect the emptying of a magma chamber with vertical composition gradient. The Valibaba Tepe ignimbrite was considered part of the famous Cappadocian ignimbrites, but is distinct from them insofar as the other ones (with the possible exception of the Taspinar-Dikmen ignimbrites of Mount Hasan) are not associated with stratovolcanoes.

Erciyes volcano proper started developing 900,000 years ago. It was formed during two phases, starting with a basaltic andesite lava flow on the southern slope 1.7 million years ago. It was followed by the andesitic lava flows on the western flank and then by many of the dacitic lava domes. Another phase of basaltic andesite activity followed, reaching lengths of 15 kilometres (9.3 mi). Effusive activity ended with small lava flows of varying composition.

The next phase of activity was explosive, with eruptions at the summit of Erciyes generating block-and-ash flows, pumice flows, and lava domes that formed blocks of 1.5–2 metres (4 ft 11 in – 6 ft 7 in) in diameter. The deposits of this activity are found north and south of the summit of Erciyes and reach thicknesses of 18 metres (59 ft). Cora Maar is not precisely dated, but probably formed less than 100,000 years ago. The last dacitic eruption occurred 80,000 ± 10,000 years ago at Çarık Tepe although later research has discovered later lavic eruptions. Activity in the summit region probably ended before the Holocene.

Radiometric dating has yielded evidence of a major pulse of volcanic activity in the early Holocene. Dikkartin Dağ, Karagüllü Dağ, and Perikartın belong to the youngest stages of volcanic activity at Erciyes and formed on the rim of the former caldera. Radiocarbon and chlorine-36 dating of the deposits has yielded ages of 10,200 – 9,700 years before present for Dikkartin Dağ, while potassium–argon dating yielded ages of 140,000 ± 20,000 – 110,000 ± 30,000 years ago at first for all three. Radiocarbon dates of 9,971 – 9,594 and 9,984 – 9,596 years before present have been obtained for Karagüllü Dağ and Perikartın, respectively. The three eruptions appear to have occurred within a short timeframe from each other. Yılanlı Da ̆g, a lava dome in Kayseri, is also of Holocene age, having been erupted 8,900 ± 400 years ago.

Before extrusion of Dikkartin Dağ, a Plinian fall deposit with base surges and pumice flows covered a surface of 800 square kilometres (310 sq mi) at a minimum. This was followed by a phreatomagmatic phase that deposited material up to 3 metres (9.8 ft) thick, followed by another Plinian phase. The Dikkartin eruption was the strongest of the three lava dome forming eruptions and formed an eruption column 25 kilometres (16 mi) high, but it left the smallest crater of the three. This eruption at first formed a tuff ring, within which the lava dome was emplaced. Lava flows extend to lengths of 5 kilometres (3.1 mi). The dome and flow have a total volume of 0.82 cubic kilometres (0.20 cu mi), and the eruption which had a Volcano Explosivity Index of 5 has been compared to that of Mount St. Helens in North America. Karagüllü Dağ was extruded later on the northern flank. Another explosive phase, this time dominated by 20 kilometres (12 mi) long pumice flows that contain charcoal followed and generated the Perikartın lava dome which is compositionally related to Dikkartin.

The last event was the collapse of the eastern flank of Ercyies. This collapse was probably triggered by an earthquake, considering that no evidence for a concomitant eruption exists. Considering the ages of the oldest moraines contained within the collapse scar, it probably happened more than 25,000 years ago. This collapse generated a debris avalanche 16 kilometres (9.9 mi) long which dammed a lake and presently forms a hummocky deposit. The volume of rock removed by the collapse is about 1.2–1.5 cubic kilometres (0.29–0.36 cu mi).

A 1-millimetre (0.039 in) thick ash layer found in a drilling core off the coast of Israel (32°44′52″N 34°39′02″E) was dated at 8,365 ± 65 years ago in uncalibrated radiocarbon years, and an equivalent tephra has been recovered from the Dead Sea. It is known as the "S1 tephra" appears to be linked to one of these three eruptions on the basis of its composition, most likely the Dikkartin Dağ eruption, over 600 kilometres (370 mi) away from the drilling core. This eruption probably took place in winter. A tephra layer named Tyam-1, found in Yammoûneh in Lebanon and dated at 8,600 ± 850 years before present, is probably equivalent to this ash layer. Likewise, a thin tephra layer in the Sodmein Cave of the Red Sea Hills, 1,300 kilometres (810 mi) south of Erciyes, has been linked to the Dikkartin Dağ eruption, as was a layer in the former lake at Tayma in Saudi Arabia, 1,240 kilometres (770 mi) away from Erciyes. Other tephras identified in the Levantine Sea and erupted between 10,000 and 8,000 years ago may also come from Erciyes. The eruptions that formed all these layers probably had profound effects on the affected Mediterranean cultures. Another tephra layer found in the Black Sea appears to come from either the Karagüllü Dağ or the Perikartın eruptions. The tephra from these eruptions thus was probably spread northeastward, in contrast to the Dikkartin Dağ eruption, which spread tephra southeastward and thus is not found in the Black Sea. The unusual southward transport of the tephra may have occurred through low altitude winds.

Andesites of less than 1,000 years of age have been identified. The occurrence of volcanic activity in historical times is not clear; Strabo (63 BC–21 AD) and Claudius Claudianus (370–410 AD) report volcanic activity, and Roman coins found in Cappadocia show the mountain smoking, but these reports may instead refer to swamp gas release in the Sultansazlığı basin and Strabo's reports appear to refer to fires in swamps. If volcanic activity occurred during historical times, it probably occurred on a parasitic vent, as the principal cone is heavily eroded. The volcano is presently considered to be dormant.

== Threats and human interaction ==
Erciyes volcano has manifested explosive eruptions preceding the formation of lava domes. Such eruptions may endanger the cities of Kayseri, Hacilar, and Talas. Melting of the remnant ice on the volcano may generate dangerous lahars; in 1985 an eruption of Nevado del Ruiz volcano in Colombia claimed 20,000 fatalities after such a mudflow. Even without an eruption, strong rainfall could form mudflows on the densely populated steep slopes of the volcano. The volcano is monitored with seismometers and its deformation has been measured. Analyses of the magmatic system indicate that Erciyes has a small, cold and possibly waning magmatic system, unlike Mount Hasan.

The ancient Hittites left rock carvings and even an artificial tunnel on Mount Erciyes. Strabo mentions the view from its summit. According to a vita of Saint Lazaros of Mount Galesios (11th century CE) written by his disciple Gregory the Cellarer, Lazaros climbed and descended Mount Erciyes in the depths of winter while singing the Psalms, as he encountered harsh weather and even a bear and attacking dogs.

At present, about five hotels exist at the mountain, which is a major winter sports site. In 2010, 324,221 tourists visited the mountain and Kayseri, most of them domestic tourists. A ski centre, Erciyes Ski Resort, exists on Erciyes. The resort lies at an altitude of 2,200 metres (7,200 ft) at the Üçker valley.
