= The Spoils of War (symposium) =

International symposium

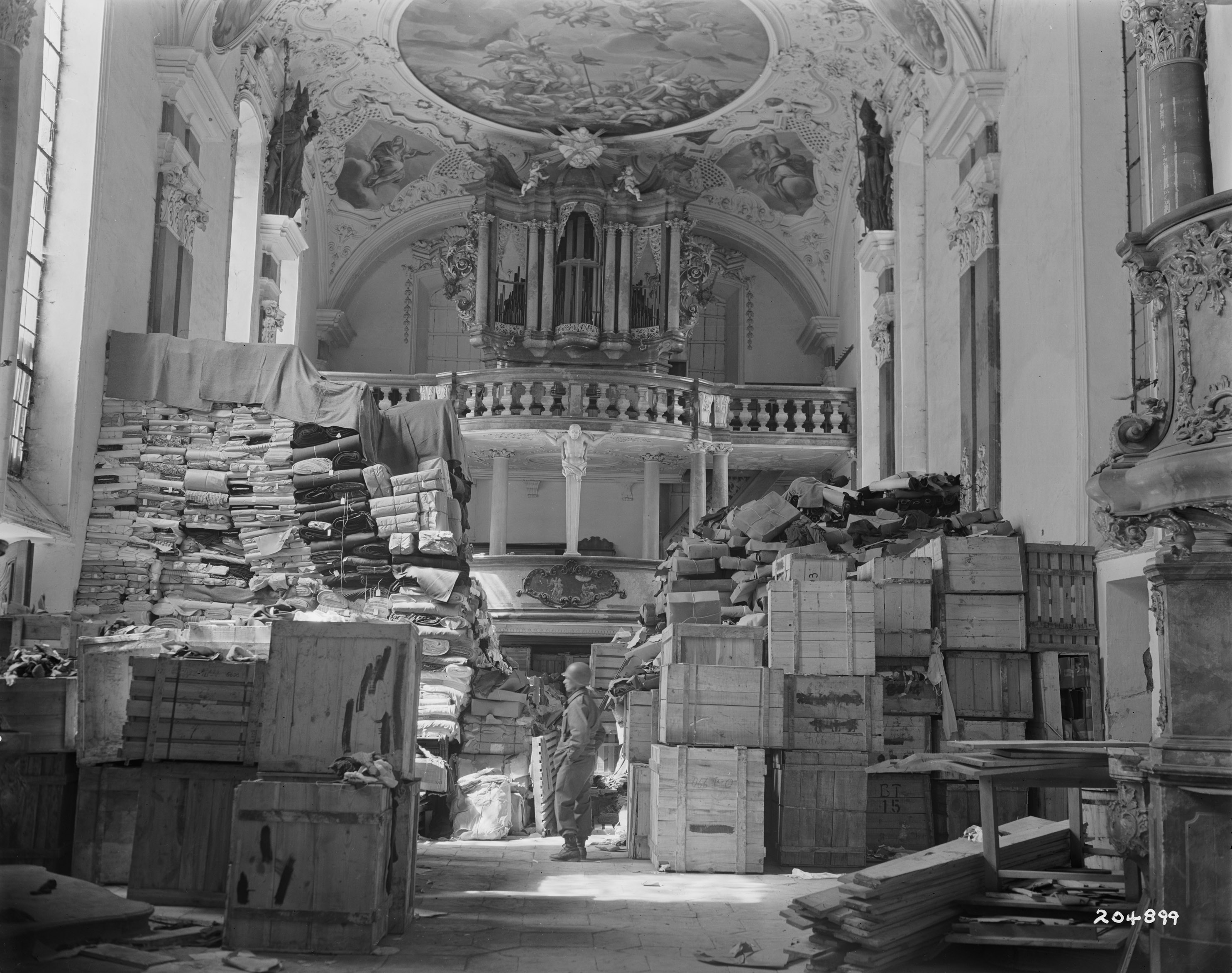
German repository of looted possessions in a church at Ellingen, Bavaria, May 1945.

"The Spoils of War—World War II and Its Aftermath: The Loss, Reappearance, and Recovery of Cultural Property" was an international symposium held in New York City in 1995 to discuss the artworks, cultural property, and historic sites damaged, lost, or plundered as a result of World War II. The three-day event was sponsored by the Bard Graduate Center for Studies in the Decorative Arts to commemorate the 50th anniversary of the end of the war. The conference was organized by Elizabeth Simpson, an archaeologist and professor at the Bard Graduate Center.

Worldwide interest in the subject was generated by announcements in 1991 of the location of objects confiscated by Soviet trophy brigades from German territory at the end of the war. The unification of Germany in 1990 and the dissolution of the Soviet Union in 1991 were followed by a number of goodwill agreements between Germany and the countries of the former USSR, as well as the opening of official negotiations on repatriation. It was this spirit of openness and cooperation that made the New York symposium possible. This initial gathering of concerned parties would be followed by a series of conferences, initiatives, agreements, and repatriations that continue to the present.

== New York conference and proceedings ==
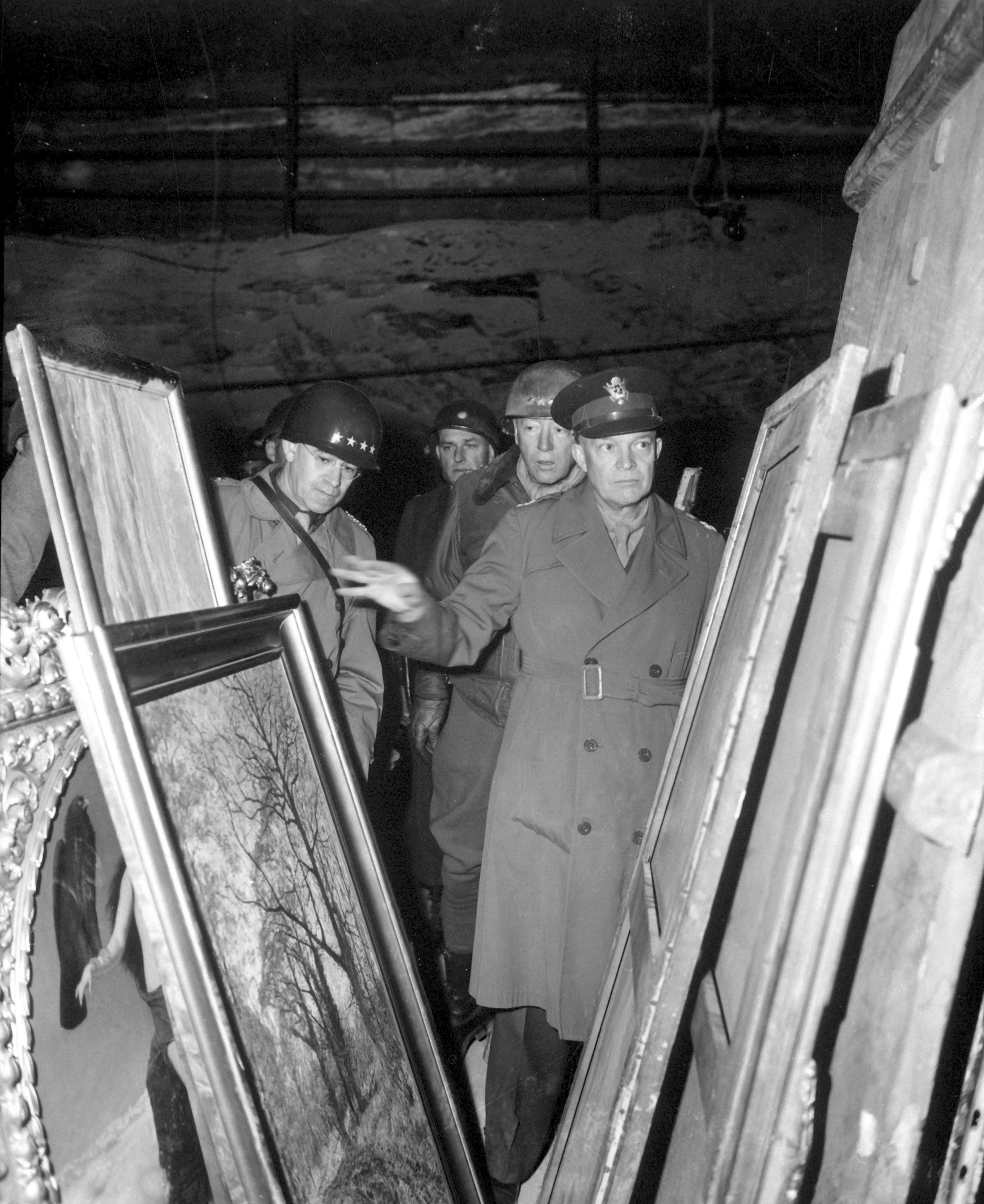
Generals Bradley, Patton, and Eisenhower examining works of art stored by the Nazis in the Merkers mine, Germany, April 1945.

The program featured 48 notable speakers—government officials, diplomats, journalists, art historians, archaeologists, lawyers, and independent researchers—from Poland, the Netherlands, Belgium, France, Russia, Ukraine, Belarus, Germany, Austria, Hungary, Australia, England, and the United States. The combined testimony laid bare another horrifying dimension to the anguish of human suffering wrought by the Second World War.

The symposium was the first to address the issue in a public forum, and led to numerous initiatives on provenance research by the governments involved as well as museums, libraries, and art dealers internationally. As a result, the art world was changed irrevocably. Acquisitions policies were revised in museums in Europe and the United States, and organizations were restructured to facilitate the identification of artistic and cultural objects that had been stolen or transferred illegally during and after the war. Processes were established in several countries to allow families to claim their missing property; such claims have resulted in many works being restored to the heirs and descendants of the rightful owners.

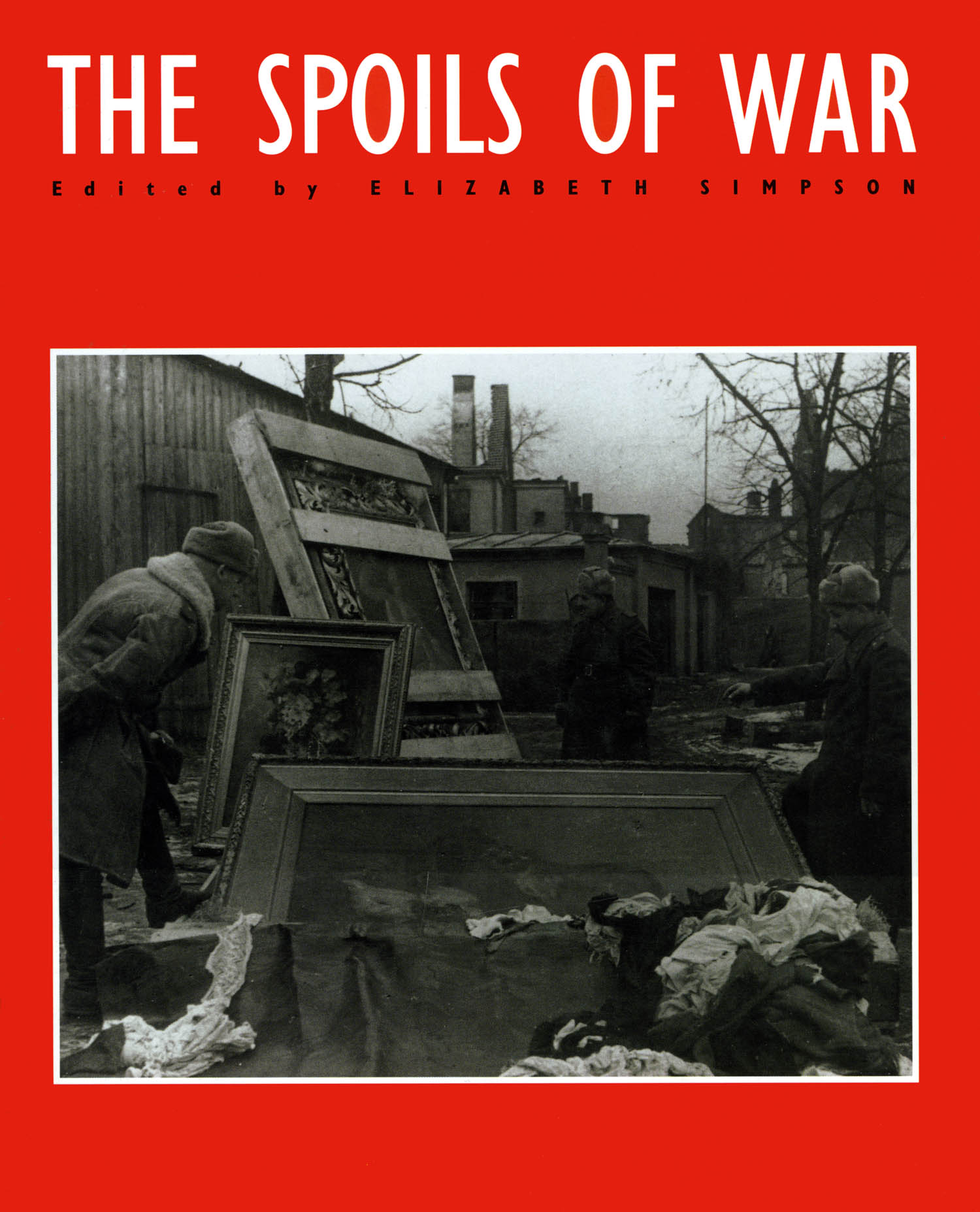
The Spoils of War (1997), showing paintings stolen from the Russian palaces at Petrodvorets and Pushkin, abandoned in March 1945 in East Prussia by German soldiers fleeing the Red Army.

The conference proceedings were published in a comprehensive volume edited by Elizabeth Simpson (Harry N. Abrams, 1997). The book includes 17 treaties, conventions, and other official documents relating to the protection and return of cultural property. These begin with the "Lieber Code" of 1863 and the "Hague Convention of 1907," and continue with the treaties following World War I, the "Hague Convention and Protocol of 1954" for the protection of cultural property in the event of armed conflict, the "1970 UNESCO Convention" on the prevention of illicit import, export, and transfer of ownership of cultural property, and the UNIDROIT Convention on Stolen or Illegally Exported Cultural Objects of 1995.

== Losses resulting from World War II ==
Elizabeth Simpson and lawyer Jeanette Greenfield, author of The Return of Cultural Treasures, provided introductory comments on the subject, along with Lynn Nicholas, author of The Rape of Europa, who discussed the massive displacement of art and cultural property that occurred during World War II. Individual countries detailed the damage to their national patrimony, as well as losses suffered by individuals. A talk on Jewish ceremonial art and private property was given by Vivian Mann, then Chair of Judaica at The Jewish Museum, New York. These reports were followed by a series of contributions on laws, directives, and conventions in place at the beginning of World War II, directives in force in Germany during the war, and laws enacted by the Allies to counter German appropriations. These and all the conference presentations are published in the proceedings.

== The "Monuments Men" ==
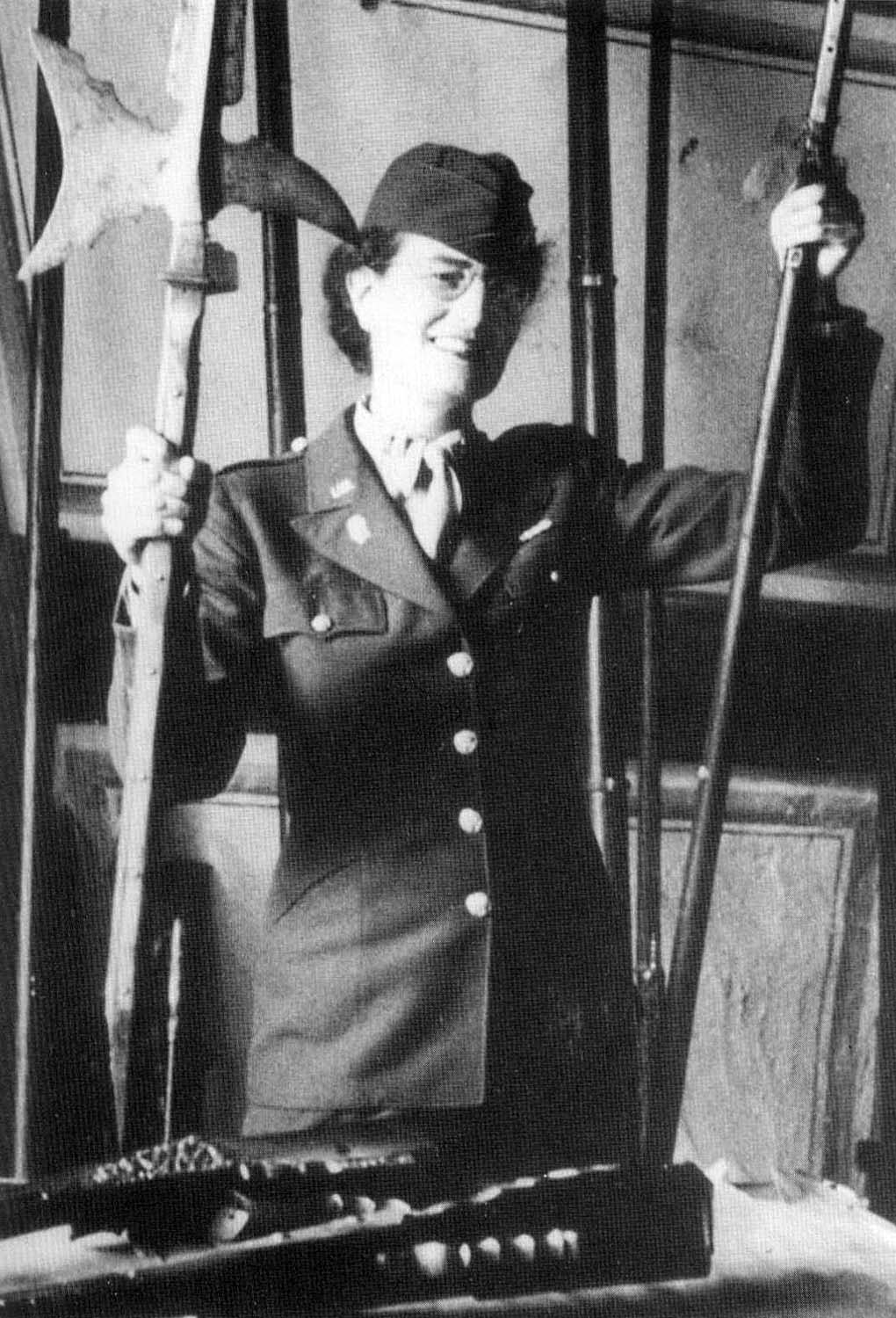
Captain Edith Standen at the Wiesbaden Collecting Point, 1946.

A group of the so-called "Monuments Men" (which in fact included several women) detailed their firsthand accounts of the work of the art-specialist officers of the Western Allies. Members of the Monuments, Fine Arts, and Archives Section of the Office of Military Government, United States, recounted the discovery of looted art and bullion stashed in German mines, bunkers, castles, and churches, along with the redistribution and repatriation of these finds through the Munich and Wiesbaden Collecting Points. Of the veteran officers speaking at the New York conference—James S. Plaut (d. 1996), Walter I. Farmer (d. 1997), Edith A. Standen (d. 1998), Craig Hugh Smyth (d. 2006), S. Lane Faison (d. 2006), and Bernard Taper (d. 2016)—none survives today.

== Reappearance and recovery ==
Other repatriations occurred at the end of the war, effected by the US State Department, the USSR, and other countries. Case studies include fascinating discussions of the Quedlinburg Church Treasures, the Soviet Secret Repositories, and the "Treasure of Priam," which was excavated by Heinrich Schliemann at Troy in 1873, shipped out of Turkey illegally by Schliemann, ended up in Berlin, transferred to Moscow by the Soviet Trophy Brigades after the fall of Berlin, held in secret in the Pushkin Museum, and finally brought out of the secret repository and exhibited in the museum in 1996. Despite claims to ownership of the Trojan treasures by Turkey, Germany, and Greece, the objects remain in Moscow with the issue unresolved.

Heinrich Schliemann's wife, Sophia, wearing gold jewelry from Treasure A, Troy, ca. 1873.

== Current issues and cooperative efforts ==
The conference concluded with a series of presentations on current and proposed efforts to mitigate the losses suffered. Lyndel Prott, then Chief of the International Standards Section of the Cultural Heritage Division of UNESCO, offered a list of "Principles for the Resolution of Disputes Concerning Cultural Heritage Displaced during the Second World War":

1. Cultural objects that have been taken from territory occupied during or immediately after hostilities in the Second World War by any belligerent will be returned to the country from which they have been taken.
2. Where there have been successive displacements, the objects will be returned to the territory where they were located at the outbreak of hostilities in 1939.
3. Principle 1 will apply whether transfers of the cultural objects concerned have taken the form of open looting or plunder, or of transactions apparently legal in form, even when they purport to have been voluntarily effected.
4. Cultural property taken from an occupied territory shall never be detained as war reparations.
5. Where cultural objects displaced during or immediately after hostilities in the Second World War have passed into the hands of third parties, the state that is responsible for their removal from the country where they were located in 1939 shall reacquire them for return to the state from which they were taken, by repurchase, indemnity or other appropriate means.
6. No time limits can be set.
7. Cultural objects being repatriated are to be accompanied by the relevant scientific documentation where available.
8. Restitution by replacement is an available remedy where unique cultural objects have been destroyed.

== Press coverage and controversy ==
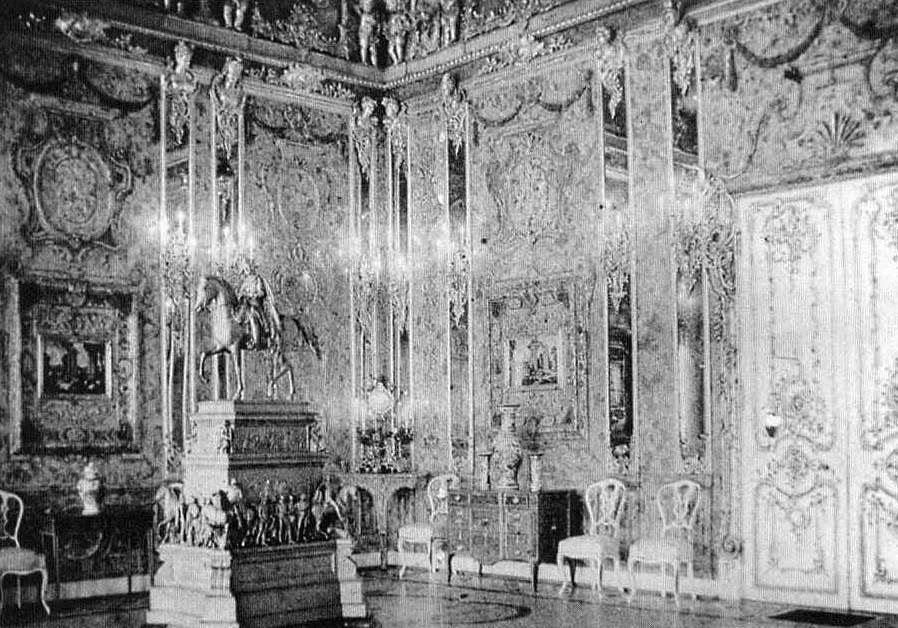
The original Amber Room in the Catherine Palace, Pushkin (Tsarskoye Selo), Russia, in an early 20th century photograph before it was lost as a result of the Second World War.

The "Spoils of War" symposium was covered extensively in the international press, including articles carried by the Associated Press and in The New York Times, New York Newsday, The Wall Street Journal, The Christian Science Monitor, The Observer, The Washington Post, The Philadelphia Inquirer, The Art Newspaper, Frankfurter Allgemeine Zeitung, Süddeutsche Zeitung, Die Zeit, and Pravda. The Forward published a critique that appeared at the time of the symposium; at issue was whether or not the conference gave sufficient weight to Jewish wartime losses, since these losses were detailed within the greater context of the Second World War and the damages experienced by the peoples of the many nations involved.

This issue sparked a second conference in Washington, DC, in 1998. Sponsored by the United States Department of State and the United States Holocaust Memorial Museum, the "Washington Conference on Holocaust-Era Assets" assembled participants from the New York symposium along with others to discuss Jewish losses in particular, including artworks, books, and archives, as well as insurance claims and other types of assets. This resulted in a further set of "Principles on Nazi-Confiscated Art," outlined by organizer Stuart E. Eizenstat, as well as "Declarations of the Task Force for International Cooperation on Holocaust Education, Remembrance, and Research."

The New York conference has remained influential, however, due to its broader scope—dealing as it did with losses that occurred throughout Europe, inflicted not only by the Germans but also by the Soviets and western Allies, and affecting all those peoples who suffered as a result of the Second World War. The volume of conference proceedings was reviewed widely by publications in the United States and Europe, as well as The Jerusalem Post, Yeni Yüzyıl, ITAR-TASS, and others. As the only all-inclusive treatment of the subject, it is cited frequently, considered one of the most important books on World War II and its aftermath—and the loss, reappearance, and recovery of cultural property relating to the war.
