= Pacific War (disambiguation) =

The Pacific War (1941–1945), also known as the Pacific Theaters of World War II, was a conflict that pitted Axis forces, primarily the Empire of Japan, against the Allies.

"Pacific War" may also refer to:

== Wars ==
- War of the Pacific: An 1879–1884 war between Chile and an alliance of Peru and Bolivia

== Novels ==
- The Great Pacific War, a 1925 novel about a fictitious war
- Pacific War series (2007–2008), alternate history novels by Newt Gingrich & William R. Forstchen, with Albert S. Hanser

== Games ==
- War in the Pacific (board game), 1978 board wargame that simulates the WWII Pacific Campaign
- Gary Grigsby's Pacific War, 1992 video game
- Great Pacific War, 2003 board wargame that is part of the Third Reich/Great Pacific War series
- War in the Pacific (video game), 2004 video game

== See also ==
- Pacific Theatre (disambiguation)
