= Acemhöyük =

- Location within Turkey
- 38°24′41.72″N 33°50′7.74″E
- Type: Ancient Settlement
- Location: Yesilova, Aksaray Province, Turkey
- Region: Cappadocia

Site notes
- Condition: In ruins

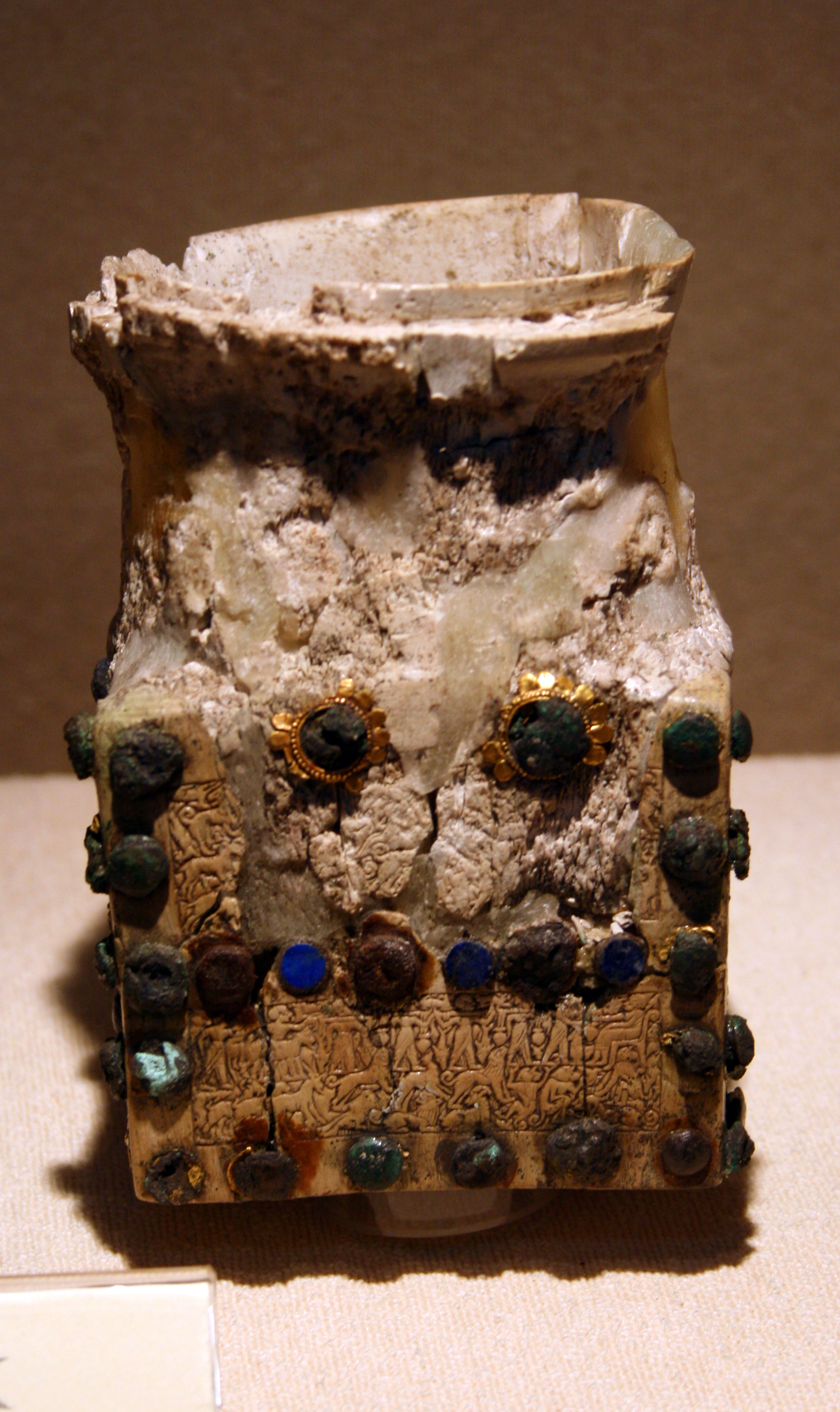
A box made from a piece of ivory and decorated with lapis lazuli, bronze and iron, found at Acemhöyük.

Central Anatolia during the period of the kārum

Acemhöyük is an archaeological site in Turkey. The tell is located near the village of Yeşilova in Merkez district, Aksaray Province. The Bronze Age name for the place was probably Purušḫanda/Purušḫattum or Ullama. The site was important during the Early Bronze Age as part of the Anatolian Trade Network and the Middle Bronze Age as a colony in the Assyrian Trade Network, with a trading post called Karum.

== Location ==
Acemhöyük is located 18 km northwest of Aksaray, on the southeastern end of the Tuz Gölü, in a fertile plain on the Uluirmak or Melendiz. The ruins are arranged, like those of Kültepe, into two parts: a settlement on a hill, measuring 700 m east–west and 600 m north–south, and a lower city, which is partially covered by the modern village of Yeşilova. According to Nimet Özgüc, the extent of the lower city is of a similar size. The highest point, the citadel, rises 20 metres above the surrounding land and is now called Sarikaya (yellow cliff) on account of the gleaming yellow mudbricks. The tell is to the south of the modern village and in the centre of it there was (or is?) a modern cemetery. Joost Blasweiler (2019) offers detailed arguments that Acemhöyük was the location of the city of Purushanda known from many cuneiform texts.

While Acemhöyük was fully a member of the Old Assyrian trade network, Konya-Karahöyük, a major settlement located to the west near Konya city, seems to have been at the western limits of that network. According to Blasweiler (2018), the Assyrian caravans probably did not reach Karahöyük, itself, on a regular basis.

== History ==
Recent excavations indicated that the town had a long history before the Assyrian Trade Colonies period. The mound was excavated by Nimet Özgüç and Aliye Öztan between 1962 and 2019.

=== Early Bronze ===
"The architectural sequence of the Early Bronze Age settlement was recovered at the southern slope of the mound. According to the current state of research, the mound has several Early Bronze Age layers (Levels XII-IV), corresponding to a period spanning from the Early Bronze Age II (2700-2450 BC) to the end of Early Bronze Age III (2450-2000 BC) during Anatolia's 3rd millennium BC chronology."

==== Anatolian Trade Network ====
In the Early Bronze, Acemhöyük was a central hub in the Anatolian Trade Network which reached Troy and the Cyclades in the west, and Mesopotamia in the east. In the mid-3rd millennium BC, Acemhöyük emerged with connections with West Anatolia and Syria.

==== Syrian bottles ====
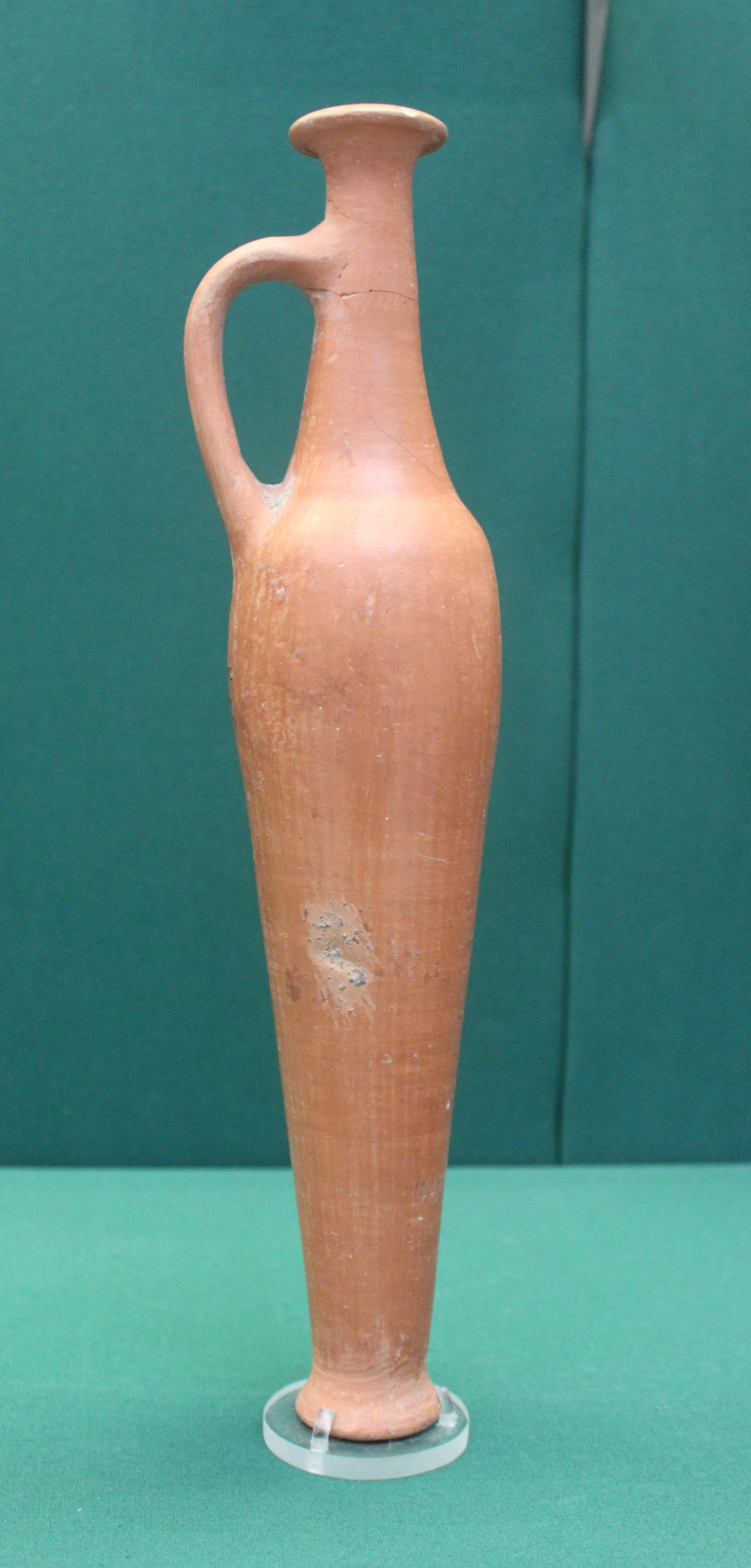
Red-burnished ceramic flask, in shape called "Syrian bottle". "Red-Lustruous Ware", wheel-made, typical of Syria and Cilicia (Anatolia) during the Late Bronze Age. From Tell Açana, ancient Alalakh

Some 'Syrian bottles' have been discovered here in Level XI of the settlement. Such items indicate the wide interregional commercial relations of Acemhöyük during the Early Bronze Age III period. They are similar to the Unguentarium bottles of the later historical periods.

Syrian bottle is a specific type of a bottle that was widespread in Syria, Anatolia, and Mesopotamia. A fine example of a Syrian bottle from Acemhöyük has been dated to the beginning of the Early Bronze Age III (2450-2300 BC). The vessel appears to have been imported, and it may be related to the flat- and ring-based flasks from Northwestern Syria and areas nearby.

Such items reflect cultural and commercial connections of the settlement, as well as its chronology. These small bottles appear mainly in funerary contexts, and sometimes also in domestic and public contexts. Their shapes can be either of a long alabastron type, or of a globular type. These bottles were probably used as containers for medicinal oils or perfumes.

Syrian bottles from ancient Anatolia were made of clay or even from metal. They originated in Mesopotamia around the mid 3rd millennium BC.

=== Middle Bronze ===
The stratigraphy in the Karum period and consists of five layers (V-I).

Layers V and IV are unexplored. Layers V and IV belong to the period before the Assyrians established karum settlements in central Anatolia.

Layer III belongs to the karum period and represents the height of the settlement's prosperity, but it was heavily destroyed by fire. The cause of this fire cannot be determined. Settlement on the hill ceased after this until it was resettled in the Hellenistic or Roman period.

Level II had houses built of wood and mudbrick built on the ruins of Layer III in a hurry.

Level I was mostly destroyed due to its proximity to the surface.

==== Assyrian Trade Network ====
In the Middle Bronze I (c. 2000-1820 BC), the Assyrians started dominating trade between Mesopotamia and Anatolia. This period is often called the "Karum Period", because the Assyrians established trade posts adjacent to city-states called "karums". This trade continued into the early Middle Bronze IIA, but started to weaken after 1750 BC when great leaders like Shamshi-Adad I of the Kingdom of Upper Mesopotamia and Hammurabi of Babylon had died.

==== Sarıkaya Palace ====
In the Middle Bronze IIA, a palace building was built on the citadel. The western part of the palace has been completely destroyed by later settlement and modern activity. The 1.5-2 metre thick walls are still visible up to 3.8 metres high in places. The palace must have contained around 50 rooms (the exact number is uncertain due to the subsequent destruction). The northern, eastern and western sides were surrounded by a portico, made of marble bases and wooden pillars. The ground floor of the building was used for storage purposes. Clay bullae were found in all the rooms. It is assumed that the rooms of the officials were on the upper floor, as at Kültepe.

In 2016 new research using carbon dating and dendrology on timber used in this site and the palace in Kültepe show the felling dates for primary construction of the Sarıkaya Palace at Acemhöyük are placed at RY730-731 on the MBA chronology. RY732 equates with 1793–1784 BCE (68.2% hpd; the 95.4% hpd is 1797–1781 BCE). This research shows that middle or low-middle chronology are the only remaining possible chronologies that fit these new data.

The clay bullae in the Sarikaya Palace included sealings of Dugedu, a daughter of Yahdun-Lim of Mari (c. 1820-1796 BC), king Shamshi-Adad I (c. 1808–1776 BC), and king Aplahanda of Carchemish (c. 1786-1766 BC).

In all, 16 imprints of the two seals of king Aplahanda were found (his cylinder seal CS 7, and seal CS 8).

Inscription on a sealing of Shamshi-Adad:

dUTUsi dIskur
Sakin dEnlil
Šamši-Adad Appointee of the god Enlil

==== Cuneiform texts ====
Two additional Old Assyrian documents were discovered in Acemhöyük during the excavations of 2012/2013. One is a label, and the other is a small tablet, which is the first such discovery here. They were found in the structure known as the "Service Building" within the Sarikaya palace.

The orthographic and contextual features of the discovery indicate that the tablet is contemporary with the Level Ib of Kültepe. The date is estimated as around 1700 BC, which is the time towards the end of the Old Assyrian Period.

==== Pratt Ivories ====
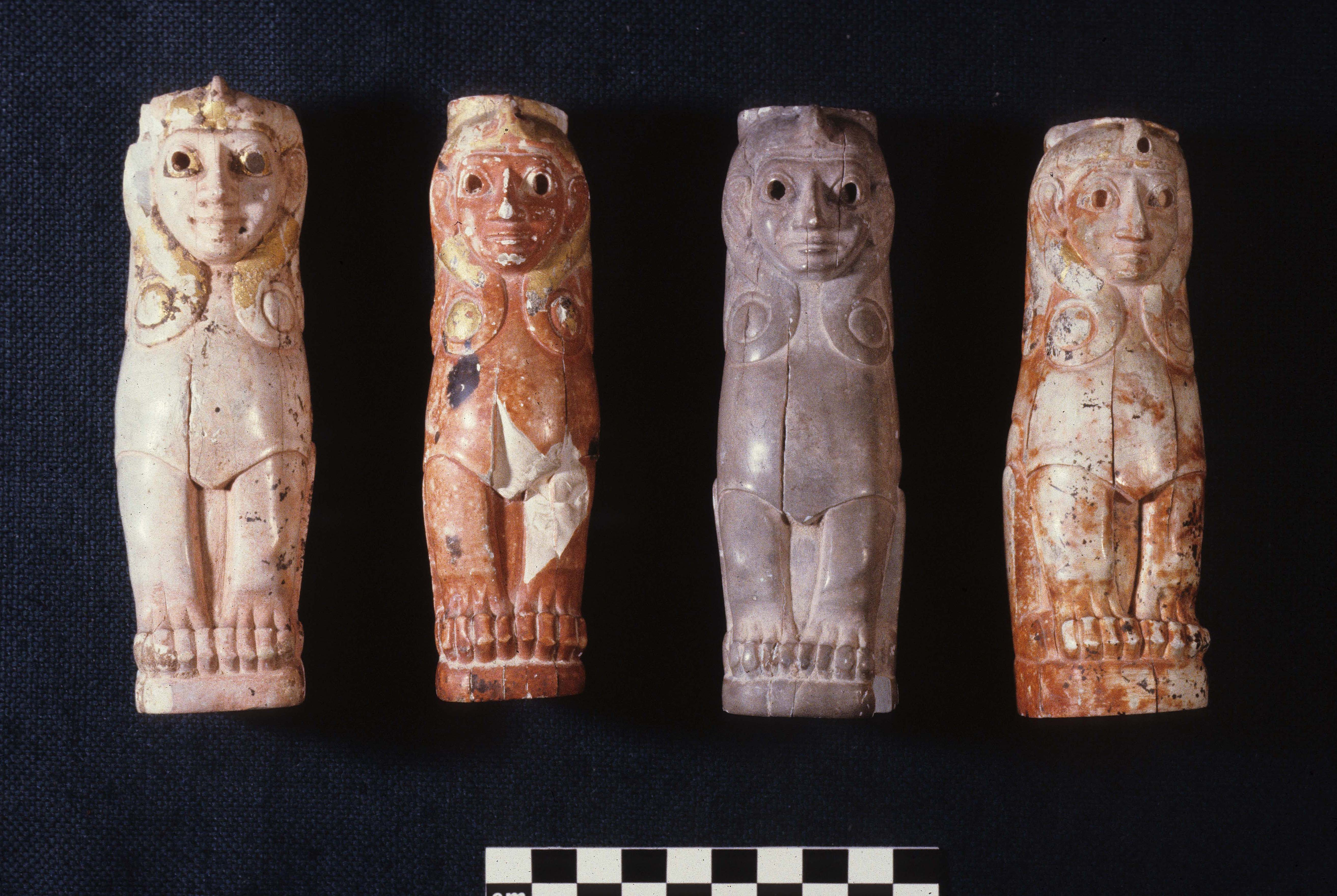
Four ivory sphinxes from Acemhöyük, Turkey. Pratt ivories, Metropolitan Museum of Art

Between 1932 and 1937, a group of 2nd millennium B.C. ivory furniture fittings were donated to the Metropolitan Museum of Art by the collector George D. Pratt. Subsequent scholarship has shown that several of these pieces originally formed part of an elaborate gold and ivory throne, which has been convincingly reconstructed by Elizabeth Simpson. In the 1960s, archaeological excavations of the Sarikaya Palace revealed stylistically similar ivory pieces, including a wing that matched with a falcon in the Pratt collection. Rumors of looting from the site and photographs of the ivories from a nearby dealer have further demonstrated that the pieces originally came from Acemhöyük, where they were looted and eventually sold on the antiquities market. Since their acquisition by the Metropolitan Museum of Art, they have become known as the Pratt Ivories or the Acemhöyük ivories.

=== Greco-Roman Period ===
The final settlement layer dates to the Greaco-Roman period and consists of the foundations of habitations.

== Excavation history ==
Excavation of Acemhöyük began in 1962 under the General Directorate of Antiquities and Museums in conjunction with the University of Ankara. From 1962 to 1988, Nimet Özgüç led the excavations. Since 1989, the project has been led by Aliye Öztan. Some the finds are on display in the Aksaray Museum; others are displayed at the Niğde Archaeological Museum.

== See also ==
- Yeşilova, Aksaray
- Aksaray

== Bibliography ==
- Özgüç, Nimet, 2015 Acemhöyük - Burus̆haddum I: Silindir mühürler ve mühür baskılı bullalar/Cylinder Seals and Bullae with Cylinder Seal Impressions. Ankara: Türk Tarih Kurumu, Ankara.

- 1966 "Excavations at Acemhöyük," Anadolu (Anatolia) 10.

- Aliye Öztan 1979 "Acemhöyük Sarıkaya Sarayında Bulunan İki Taş Tabak/ Two Stone Plates from the Sarıkaya Palace at Açemhöyük" Belleten XLIII/ p. 170, 381–384, 385-388

- 1986 "Acemhöyük Taş Kapları" Belleten LII/203 (1988) 393-406
- 1990 "1989 Yılı Acemhöyük Kazıları" XII. Kazı Sonuçları Toplantısı, Cilt I, Ankara, pp. 247-258
- 1992 "1991 Yılı Acemhöyük Kazıları" XIV. Kazı Sonuçları Toplantısı, Cilt I, Ankara, pp. 281-300
- 1993b "1992 Yılı Acemhöyük Kazıları" XV. Kazı Sonuçları Toplantısı, Cilt I, Ankara, pp. 245-255
- 1993c L.Özen – S.Tazegül, "Acemhöyük'den Bir Grup Gümüş Eser," 1992 Yılı Anadolu Medeniyetleri Müzesi Konferansları, Ankara, pp. 146-149
- 1994 "1993 Acemhöyük Kazıları" XVI. Kazı Sonuçları Toplantısı, Cilt I, Ankara, pp. 189-192
- 1996 "1994 Acemhöyük Kazıları" XVII. Kazı Sonuçları Toplantısı- I, pp. 209-213
- 1997b "Acemhöyük Gümüş Hazinesi" Belleten LXI/ 231, pp. 233-271
- 1997c "Acemhöyük" Eczacıbaşı Sanat Ansiklopedisi, İstanbul, pp. 14-15
- 1998 "Preliminary Report on the Arıbaş Cemetery at Acemhöyük" Essays on Ancient Anatolia in the Second Millennium B.C. Bulletin of the Middle Eastern Culture Center in Japan Vol. X, pp. 167-175
- 1999 M.G.Drahor- M. Bayrak- O.M.İlkışık ile birlikte, "Acemhöyük'ten Manyetik ve Elektromanyetik -VLF Sonuçlari / Magnetic and Electromagnetic –VLF Results from Acemhöyük." DEÜ Mühendislik Fakültesi, Fen ve Mühendislik Dergisi. Cilt: 1 Sayi 2, pp. 81-99
- 2001 "1998-1999 Acemhöyük Kazıları" 22. Kazı Sonuçları Toplantısı I (Ankara), pp. 119-128
- 2002 "2000 Yılı Acemhöyük Kazıları" 23. Kazı Sonuçları Toplantısı 2. Cilt. Ankara, pp. 327-334
- "Acemhöyük Kazıları 2001" 24. Kazı Sonuçları Toplantısı (Kültür Bakanlığı, baskıda)
