= William Honan =

American journalist and author

- Born: William Holmes Honan; May 11, 1930; Manhattan, New York City, New York
- Died: April 28, 2014 (aged 83); Norwalk, Connecticut
- Occupations: Journalist, author
- Spouses: Sally H. Trope (divorce); Nancy Burton (m. 1977–2014)
- Children: 3

William Holmes Honan (May 11, 1930 – April 28, 2014) was an American journalist and author who directed coverage of the arts at The New York Times as its culture editor in the 1980s. Honan held senior editorial positions at the New York Times Magazine, Newsweek, Saturday Review and The Villager, a weekly newspaper serving downtown Manhattan.

Honan also helped solve the theft of medieval art from Quedlinburg: the disappearance of over $200 million worth of medieval treasures from Quedlinburg, Germany at the end of World War II. The quest to find the "Quedlinburg Hoard" later became the subject of one of Honan's books.

== Early life ==
Honan was born in Manhattan on May 11, 1930, the son of William Francis Honan, a thoracic surgeon and Annette Neudecker Honan, a journalist. He is a brother of Park Honan, an academic and author.

He graduated from Oberlin College in 1952 with a bachelor's degree in history. In 1955 he earned a master's degree in drama from the University of Virginia. After serving in the Army, Honan moved to New York City where he managed Ed Koch's early political campaigns and began a career in journalism.

== Career ==
=== The Villager ===
Honan worked at The Villager, a downtown New York City paper, from 1957 to 1960, and is credited with turning the publication from "a little society paper" to a significant force in Manhattan politics. Serving as editor, Honan established himself as a crusading voice for reform against the Tammany Hall political machine and the automobile-centric visions of the autocratic urban planner Robert Moses.

Honan convinced the Villager's assistant publisher, Jim Bledsoe, to endorse political candidates in 1959. In a 2,500-word, full-page editorial the paper backed Reform candidates against Carmine De Sapio, the last head of the Tammany Hall machine. The editorial accused De Sapio of widespread corruption.

De Sapio ended up winning the 1959 election by a vote The Villager called in its headline a "Razor Margin." However, the paper also correctly predicted that this race was "the last hurrah" for De Sapio and the Tammany machine. De Sapio would run in and lose in the next three election cycles.

=== The New York Times ===
Honan joined the Times in 1969 as an editor at the Times Magazine. He went on to become editor of the Travel section in 1970 and editor of the Arts and Leisure section in 1974. He was promoted to daily cultural news editor in 1982 and held that job until 1988, at which point Honan was appointed chief cultural correspondent, a position that entailed "reporting on and analyzing trends in all the arts for daily and Sunday sections."

== Books ==
=== Ted Kennedy, Profile of a Survivor ===
Through interviews, Honan published accounts of Ted Kennedy's life in a series of New York Times Magazine articles in advance of the 1972 presidential election, when there was widespread speculation that Kennedy would make a run for the White House.

Honan expanded upon these articles in his 1972 book, Ted Kennedy, Profile of a Survivor: Edward M. Kennedy after Bobby, after Chappaquiddick, and after three years of Nixon. The book covers Kennedy's early career in the Senate, the Chappaquiddick incident, the aftermath of the assassination of Robert F. Kennedy and Kennedy's anti-war speeches opposing President Richard Nixon's policy of Vietnamization.

=== Visions of Infamy ===
Visions of Infamy is a biography of Hector Charles Bywater, the leading naval journalist of the first part of the 20th century who Honan argues was the architect of Japan's naval war against the United States in the Second World War. Bywater's 1925 book, The Great Pacific War, was a fictional account of how Japan might engage the United States in a theoretical future naval conflict and how the U.S. might respond. As Honan points out in Visions of Infamy, both Japan and the U.S. adopted strategies that were remarkably faithful to what Bywater promulgated in his fictionalized war game. Honan speculates that this was more than a coincidence.

=== Treasure Hunt: A New York Times Reporter Tracks the Quedlinburg Hoard ===
Honan published Treasure Hunt: A New York Times Reporter Tracks the Quedlinburg Hoard in 1997. The book chronicles the story of how the "Quedlinburg Hoard" - a cache of medieval treasures valued at over $200 million - disappeared in the Harz Mountains at the end of the Second World War, only to resurface 40 years later in a small Texas town. In his capacity as chief cultural correspondent for the Times, Honan pursued a series of leads and discovered that an American soldier of the 87th Armored Field Infantry Battalion of the U.S. Army named Lieutenant Joe T. Meador had orchestrated one of the greatest art thefts in history at the end of the Second World War. Meador's haul included a 9th-century illuminated manuscript gospel book, the "Samuhel Gospels," a printed evangeliary (book of gospel readings for services) dating to 1513 (the Evangelistar aus St. Wiperti), both with jeweled book-covers, as well as reliquaries, an ivory liturgical comb and other objects.

== Personal life ==
Honan was married twice. His first marriage was to Sally Osbourne Hammond, widow of Ashley Gordon Trope who died in a plane crash in WWII. They were married on Aug 27, 1960 in Manhattan at the Fifteenth Street Meeting House Society of Friends; marriage ended in divorce. His second marriage to Nancy Burton, a journalist, lasted 37 years until his death. They lived in Redding, Connecticut. He had two sons, Bradley and Daniel, and a daughter, Edith, a reporter for Reuters.

== Death ==
On April 28, 2014, Honan suffered cardiac arrest and died at Norwalk Hospital in Norwalk, Connecticut. He was 83.
