= Pacific Theatre =

Pacific Theatre or Pacific Theater may refer to:

== Theatres of war ==
=== World War II ===
- Pacific War, the theatre of World War II that was fought in Asia and the Pacific
  - Asiatic-Pacific theater, the theatre of operations of US forces in the Pacific War
  - Pacific Ocean theater of World War II
    - South West Pacific theatre of World War II

=== Other wars ===
- Asian and Pacific theatre of World War I
- Pacific Ocean theater, a theater of operations during the Spanish–American War

== Other uses ==
- Pacific Theatres, a defunct American chain of movie theatre in the Los Angeles metropolitan area of California
- P.T.O. (video game) (Pacific Theatre of Operations), a 1989 video game developed and published by Koei

== See also ==
- Pacific War (disambiguation)
- PTO (disambiguation)
