= Pratt Ivories =

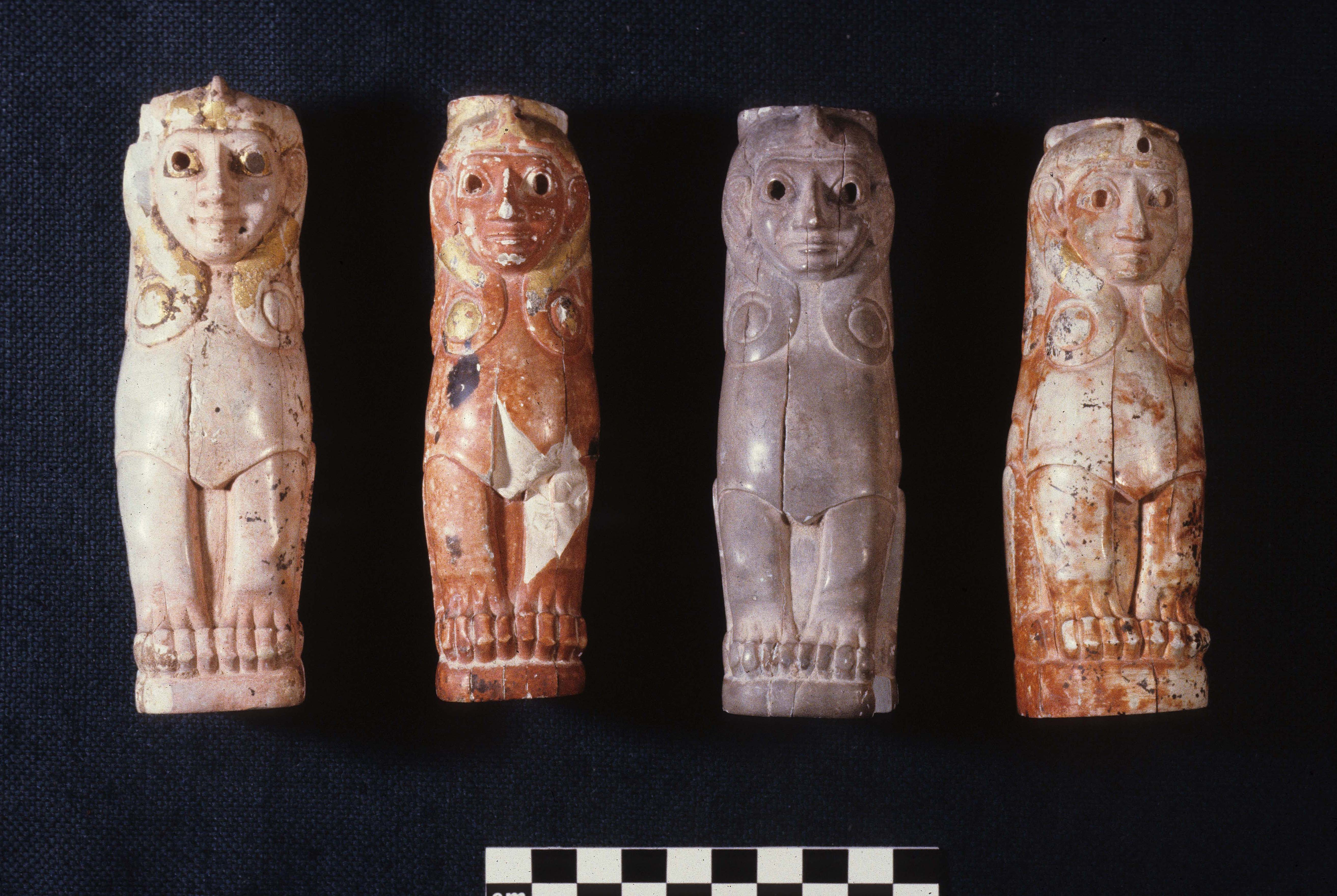
Four ivory sphinxes from Acemhöyük, Turkey. Pratt ivories, Metropolitan Museum of Art

The Pratt Ivories, also known as the Acemhöyük Ivories, are a collection of furniture attachments produced in Anatolia in the early second millennium B.C. They were donated to the Metropolitan Museum of Art between 1932 and 1937 by Mr. and Mrs. George D. Pratt. The group represents one of the most important assemblages of furniture fittings from the ancient Near East. In particular, a preserved set of four sphinxes, three lion legs, a falcon, and two recumbent gazelles, comprise the earliest and most complete evidence for a luxury chair or throne from the ancient world. Many of the other pieces in the group likely belonged to a number of small decorative objects.

== Acquisition and interpretation ==
None of the items gifted in these donations were scientifically excavated. Rather, they were purchased on the art market for the Pratt's extensive personal art collection. Mr. and Mrs. George D. Pratt subsequently donated the ivory pieces to the Metropolitan Museum of Art in a series of four donations occurring between 1932 and 1937. The fittings were also accompanied by numerous clay sealings, terracotta objects, plates, and figurines.

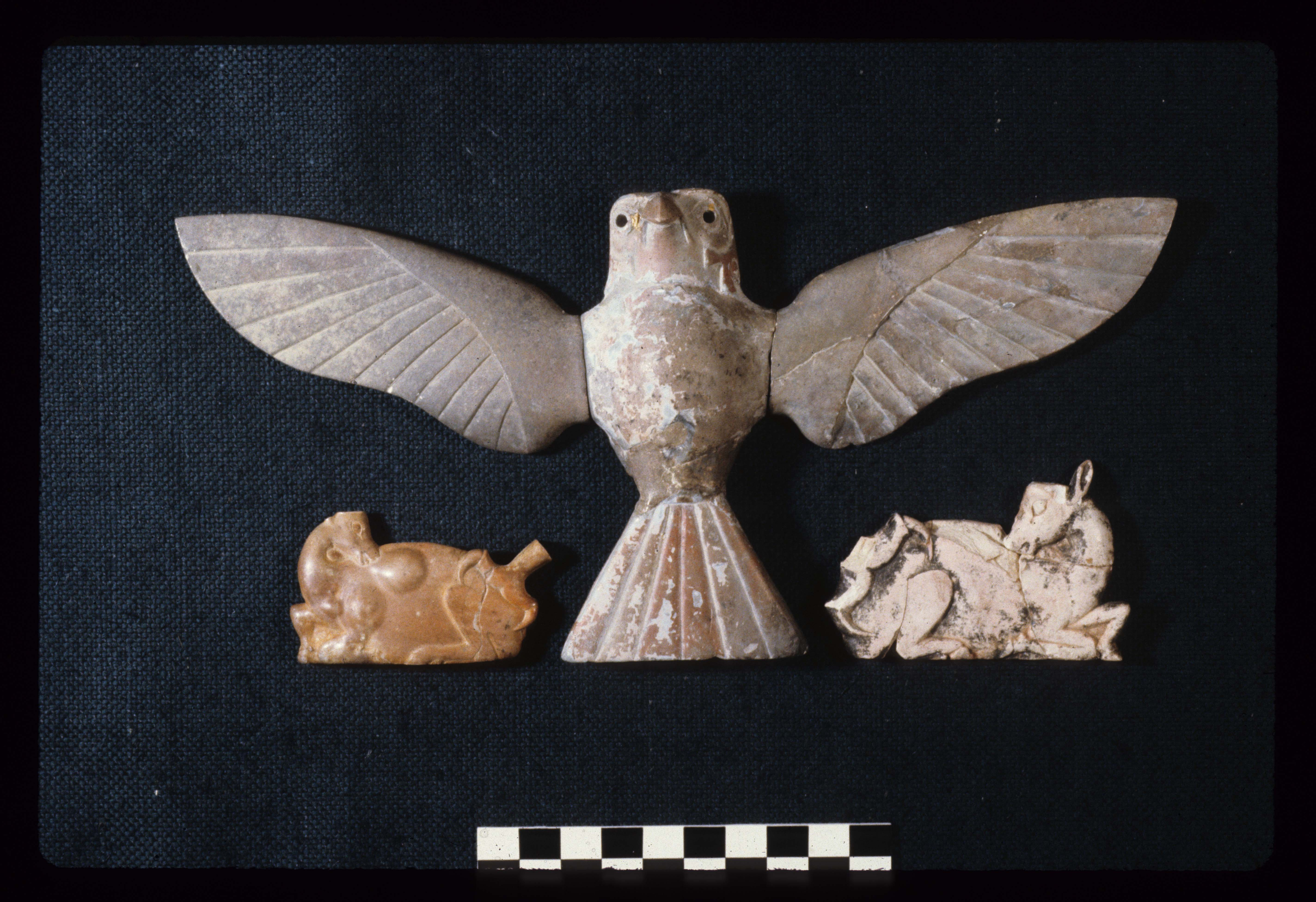
Ivory falcon and gazelles from Acemhöyük, Turkey. Pratt ivories, Metropolitan Museum of Art

Two of the ivory sphinxes and a plaque featuring a seated lion were given in the first donation in 1932. At the time, the sphinxes were interpreted as "little ivory stool legs" having been made by a Phoenician or Syrian craftsman for the Assyrian market. This assessment was largely based on their resemblance to pieces uncovered in excavations of the Assyrian capital, Nimrud. This comparison suggests a date of manufacture in the early first millennium B.C.

From 1936 to 1937, following the death of her husband, Mrs. Pratt gave numerous other ivory pieces in three successive groups, eventually contributing sixty-six ivory objects, in addition to the three works donated in 1932. While these were immediately recognized as furniture attachments and fittings, scholars continued to debate the origin and date of their production. By 1936, M.S. Dimand, a curator in the museum, challenged the initial assessment of the works, dating them to the end of the second millennium, around the 13th or 12th century B.C., and assigning their production to an "unknown Aramaean art center in Northern Syria."

== Acemhöyük ==
Approximately three decades later, excavations at Acemhöyük in Turkey provided a conclusive answer to the question of the ivories' date and origin. Led by Nimet Özgüç, digging at the site began in 1962, revealing two monumental buildings dating to the early second millennium B.C. One of these structures, in the south-eastern region of the mound, was termed the Sarikaya palace. It had originally consisted of around fifty rooms before ultimately being destroyed by a large fire. Excavations of its rooms revealed numerous clay bullae, which had been baked by the conflagration. These sealings could be connected to known historical figures, which helped provide a date for the palace in the late 19th and 18th centuries B.C.

In 1965, excavations revealed other important finds. In room NA-OA/46, located in the western area of the palace, a small group of luxury items were uncovered. This group included several ivory objects. One of these was a wing, which matched those seen on the Pratt falcon. It would come to be understood that one of the wings presented on the falcon was in fact a replica produced by the museum, and that the Acemhöyük wing in fact belonged to the piece. Other items found were stylistically comparable to the Pratt ivories, including an ivory lion and panels bearing rosette and guilloche designs. Clay bullae matching those in the Pratt collection were also uncovered. Furthermore, later investigations by Machteld Mellink uncovered a photograph from an antiquities dealer in Antakya, which showed of two of the Pratt sphinxes. Reportedly these came from Aksaray, a town near Acemhöyük where items looted from the site were often brought to be sold. All of this evidence effectively demonstrated that the assemblage originated at this site, having been removed illicitly for sale on the antiquities market. The date and origin of the pieces are now understood to be 19th-18th century B.C. and of Anatolian production.

== Simpson's Ivory Chair Reconstruction ==
Reconstruction of the ivory chair from Acemhöyük, Turkey, front view. Drawing by Elizabeth Simpson

=== Form ===
Although the Pratt ivories cannot be fully understood due to the loss of their archaeological context, Elizabeth Simpson, through in depth analysis of the sphinxes and lion legs determined that the pieces were originally part of what had been a low throne or chair. Her reconstruction of the work, based on close investigation of the ivories' construction, reveals a chair with legs formed from the sphinxes and lion legs. The sphinxes are the lowest element, touching the floor and supporting the weight of the chair. The lion legs rest on top these, facing forward. The front two sphinxes also face forward, while those forming the back legs face outwards to the sides. The rest of the chair, including the frame, seat, backs, and stretchers, would have been made from fine wood.

Reconstruction of the ivory chair from Acemhöyük, Turkey, side view. Drawing by Elizabeth Simpson

It is likely that the falcon and gazelle panels, among others, decorated the back of the chair, in accordance with examples seen in Egypt from the 18th Dynasty. Other Pratt panels with rosettes and guilloche motifs may have originally been incorporated into the design of the chair, but unfortunately it is impossible to determine their exact arrangement. Sumptuous textile cushions on the seat would have completed the luxurious effect.

=== Color ===
Examination of the ivory pieces also revealed traces of gilding and inlay, indicating that the chair was further embellished with gold, silver, and precious or semi-precious stones. Based on this trace evidence, the sphinxes appear to have had dark, inlaid eyes and were decorated with applied gold and (perhaps) silver leaf. The platforms beneath the lion paws also appear to have been gilded. Traces of silver on the falcon suggest that it too was once covered. It is possible that even more extensive areas than those suggested by the remaining traces were once gilded, but that the fire reached temperatures high enough to burn off much the metal.

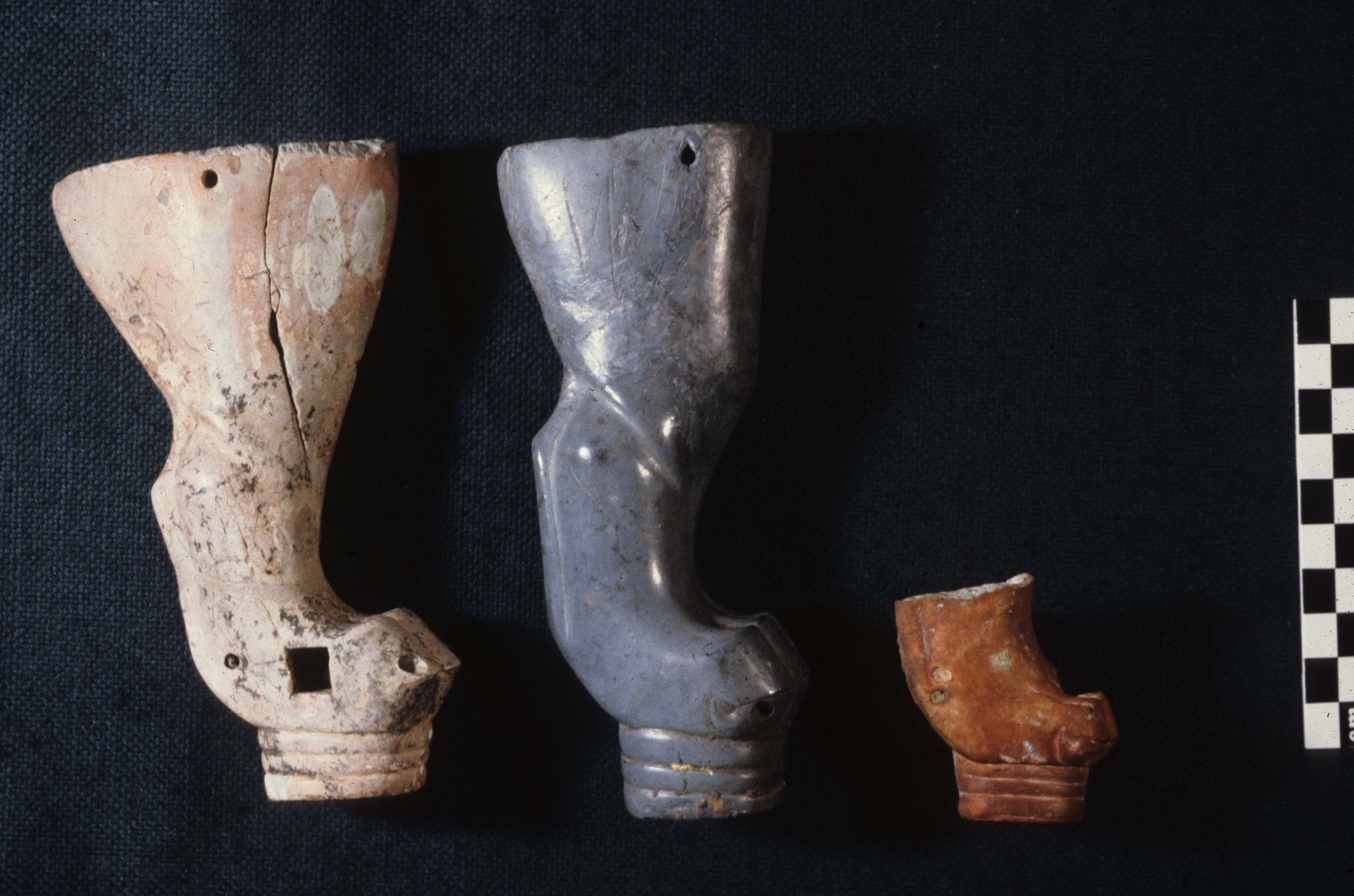
Three ivory lion legs from Acemhöyük, Turkey. Pratt ivories, Metropolitan Museum of Art

The color of the sphinxes and lion legs are also frequently commented upon in scholarship of the ivories. Variations in color occur among the pieces (gray, pink, orange, and red), resulting in pieces that match in form but not in color. These disparities are the result of varying conditions (i.e. the level of oxygen) in the fire that destroyed the palace. The ivories were covered with an iron-oxide rich clay slip, which reacted to these particular conditions, resulting in the color changes. Why the ivories were covered in this slip is another question. It is possible that the clay was applied to act as a bole, to assist in the application and burnishing of gold leaf. Simpson notes, however, that the slip occurs on the undersides and backs of the pieces, which would not have been gilded. Red ivory is also a decorative form attested to in texts of the period, which scholars have interpreted as meaning that ivory was often stained a reddish color. Perhaps in this case, the slip performed two functions, as a bole for applied gilding, and as a colorant for the exposed areas of ivory.

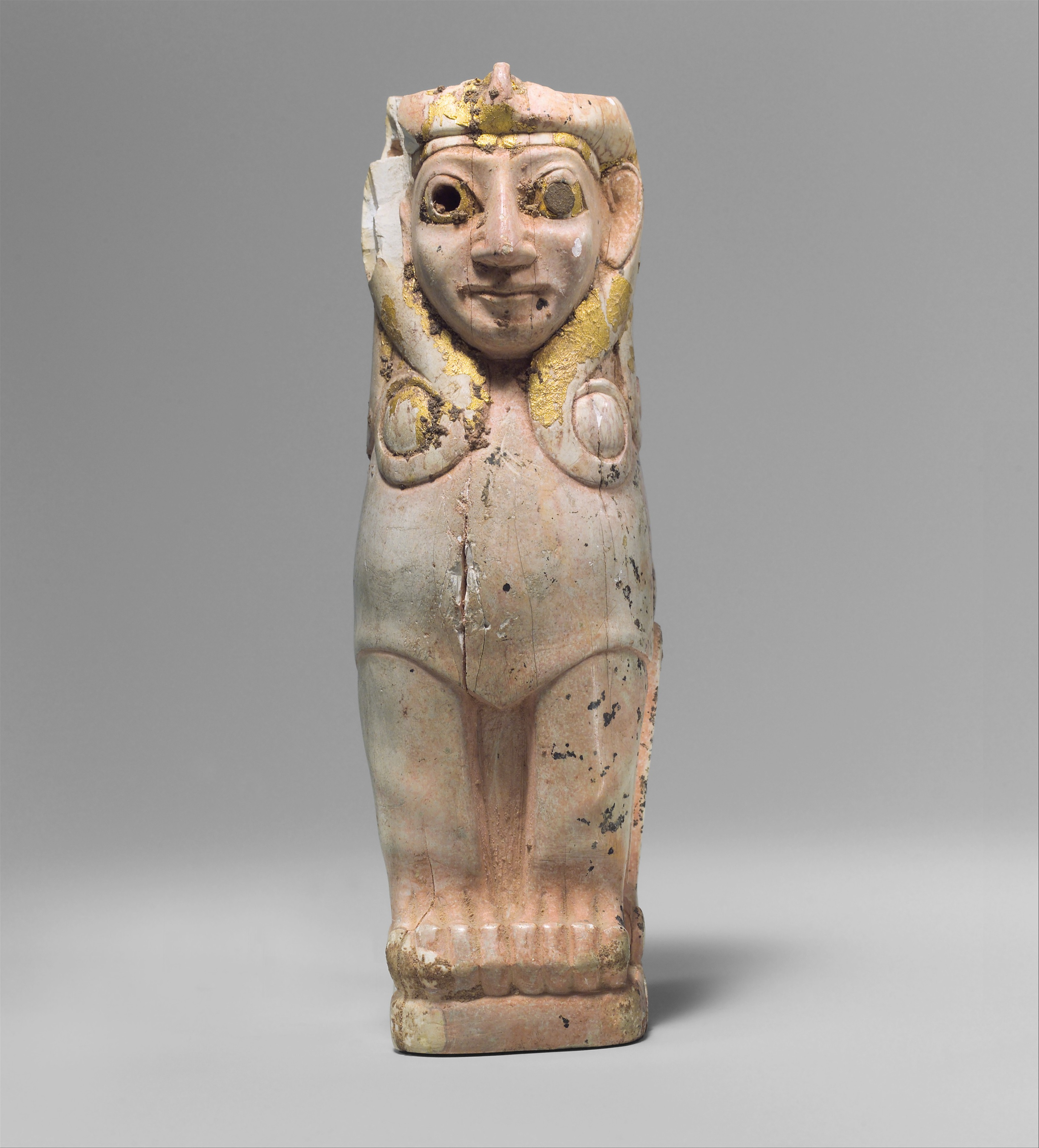
Furniture support- female sphinx with Hathor-style curls from Acemhöyük, Turkey. Pratt Ivories, Metropolitan Museum of Art
