= Yeşilova, Aksaray =

Yeşilova Acem
- Municipality
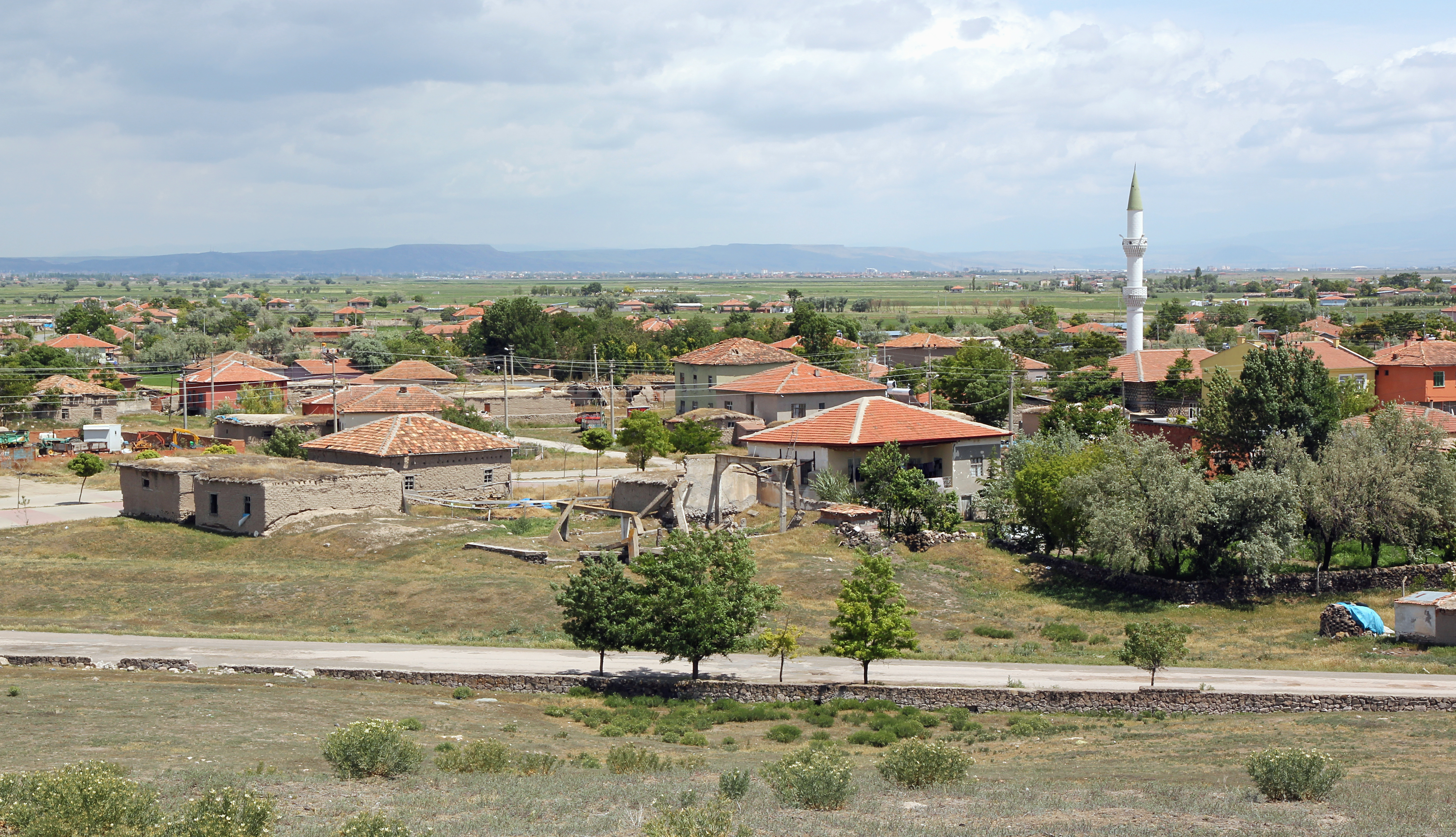

- Location within Turkey Location within Turkey Central Anatolia
- Coordinates: 38°24′N 33°50′E
- Country: Turkey
- Province: Aksaray
- District: Aksaray
- Elevation: 1,055 m (3,461 ft)
- Population (2021): 3,917
- Time zone: UTC+3 (TRT)
- Postal code: 68180
- Area code: 0382

Yeşilova (former Acem) is a town (belde) and municipality in the Aksaray District, Aksaray Province, Turkey. Its population is 3,917 (2021). At 38°24′N 33°50′E it is 18 kilometres (11 mi) to Aksaray. The settlement was founded in 1517 by a small Turkmen clan from Iran. Iran is also known as Acem and the settlement was named accordingly. The mound near the settlement was named as Acemhöyük, which is now thought to be the tumulus of Purushanda an ancient settlement. In 1928 Yeşilova was declared a township.
