= The Great Pacific War =

1925 novel by Hector Charles Bywater

- Author: Hector Charles Bywater
- Language: English
- Publication date: 1925

The Great Pacific War was a 1925 novel by British author Hector Charles Bywater which discussed a hypothetical future war between Japan and the United States. The novel accurately predicted a number of details about the Pacific Campaign of World War II. Bywater was a naval correspondent for the London Daily Telegraph.

== Plot ==
In The Great Pacific War, the war begins with a Japanese invasion of Manchuria, Formosa and Korea. Japan then stages a surprise attack which results in the nearly complete destruction of the Panama Canal, by exploding a freighter full of explosives in the Gaillard Cut.

== Legacy ==
In Infamy: Pearl Harbor and Its Aftermath, John Toland states that Isoroku Yamamoto was in the US in 1925 and might have read the New York newspapers' reviews of "The Great Pacific War," which was translated into Japanese and read by senior officers of the Japanese Imperial Navy.

Bywater died in August 1940, just a year before the Japanese attack on Pearl Harbor.

== Sources ==
- Honan, W. H. (1991), Visions of Infamy: The untold story of how journalist Hector C. Bywater devised the plans that led to Pearl Harbor, New York: St. Martin's Press, ISBN 0-312-08332-7
