= Washington Principles on Nazi-Confiscated Art =

1998 statement concerning restitution of art

Washington Conference Principles on Nazi-Confiscated Art
- Presented: 3 December 1998
- Author: Stuart E. Eizenstat
- Subject: Nazi plunder
- Purpose: Restitution of confiscated artworks

The Washington Principles on Nazi-Confiscated Art, formally the Washington Conference Principles on Nazi-Confiscated Art and sometimes referred to as the Washington Declaration, is a statement concerning the restitution of art confiscated by the Nazi regime in Germany before and during World War II. It was released in connection with the Washington Conference on Holocaust Era Assets, held in Washington, D.C., United States, on 3 December 1998.

== The Conference ==
The conference was hosted by the United States Department of State and the United States Holocaust Memorial Museum. It assembled participants from a 1995 New York symposium, The Spoils of War—World War II and Its Aftermath: The Loss, Reappearance, and Recovery of Cultural Property, along with others, and built on the Nazi Gold conference which had been held in London in December 1997.

The conference was held from November 30 to December 3, 1998, and was attended by representatives of 44 countries and 13 nongovernmental organizations, art museums and auction houses.

The 1998 conference's aim was to discuss Jewish losses in particular, including artworks, books, and archives, as well as insurance claims and other types of assets. 44 governments, including Germany, sent delegates, as did thirteen international non-governmental organizations. The conference organizer was the U.S. Under Secretary of State for Economic, Business, and Agricultural Affairs, Stuart E. Eizenstat, who had previously been United States Ambassador to the European Union, and its chairman was Judge Abner Mikva. U.S. Secretary of State, Madeleine Albright gave the opening address.

== The Principles ==
The statement includes eleven numbered principles, prefixed:

In developing a consensus on non-binding principles to assist in resolving issues relating to Nazi-confiscated art, the Conference recognizes that among participating nations there are differing legal systems and that countries act within the context of their own laws.

The principles are:

1. Art that had been confiscated by the Nazis and not subsequently restituted should be identified.
2. Relevant records and archives should be open and accessible to researchers, in accordance with the guidelines of the International Council on Archives.
3. Resources and personnel should be made available to facilitate the identification of all art that had been confiscated by the Nazis and not subsequently restituted.
4. In establishing that a work of art had been confiscated by the Nazis and not subsequently restituted, consideration should be given to unavoidable gaps or ambiguities in the provenance in light of the passage of time and the circumstances of the Holocaust era.
5. Every effort should be made to publicize art that is found to have been confiscated by the Nazis and not subsequently restituted in order to locate its pre-War owners or their heirs.
6. Efforts should be made to establish a central registry of such information.
7. Pre-War owners and their heirs should be encouraged to come forward and make known their claims to art that was confiscated by the Nazis and not subsequently restituted.
8. If the pre-War owners of art that is found to have been confiscated by the Nazis and not subsequently restituted, or their heirs, can be identified, steps should be taken expeditiously to achieve a just and fair solution, recognizing this may vary according to the facts and circumstances surrounding a specific case.
9. If the pre-War owners of art that is found to have been confiscated by the Nazis, or their heirs, can not be identified, steps should be taken expeditiously to achieve a just and fair solution.
10. Commissions or other bodies established to identify art that was confiscated by the Nazis and to assist in addressing ownership issues should have a balanced membership.
11. Nations are encouraged to develop national processes to implement these principles, particularly as they relate to alternative dispute resolution mechanisms for resolving ownership issues.

The Principles were outlined by Eizenstat, along with "Declarations of the Task Force for International Cooperation on Holocaust Education, Remembrance, and Research." He also gave a statement at the conference, titled In Support of Principles on Nazi-Confiscated Art, saying:

Several weeks ago, we prepared a discussion paper of 11 general principles, which was used as the basis of extensive consultations and which all of you have today. These principles are not, in themselves, a solution. They are a means by which nations can fashion their own solutions consistent with their own legal systems. The principles try to capture the spirit of this conference for nations engaging in this task. If these principles are properly applied, the discovery of Nazi-confiscated art will no longer be a matter of chance. Instead, there will be an organized international effort -- voluntary in nature but backed by a strong moral commitment -- to search provenance and uncover stolen art. This effort will be undertaken by governments, NGOs, museums, auctioneers and dealers.

== New guidelines and clarifications in 2024 ==
In March 2024, new guidelines were announced to clarify points notably about the meaning of "just and fair" and the inclusion of duress sales in "Nazi-looted" art:

- "Just and fair" means just and fair solutions first and foremost for the victims of the Holocaust (Shoah) and other victims of Nazi persecution and for their heirs.
- "Nazi-confiscated" and "Nazi-looted" refer to what was looted, confiscated, sequestered, and spoliated, by the Nazis, the Fascists and their collaborators through various means including but not limited to theft, coercion, and confiscation, and on grounds of relinquishment, as well as forced sales and sales under duress, during the Holocaust era between 1933 and 1945.
- The sale of art and cultural property by a persecuted person during the Holocaust era between 1933 and 1945 can be considered equivalent to an involuntary transfer of property based on the circumstances of the sale.

The United States State Department published the full list of new guidelines for Nazi looted art on its website, Best Practices for the Washington Conference Principles on Nazi-Confiscated Art.

== See also ==
- Nazi anti-Jewish Nuremberg laws
- Reichsfluchtsteuer
- Aryanization
- List of claims for restitution for Nazi-looted art
- The Holocaust in Austria
- The Holocaust in the Netherlands
- Reichsleiter Rosenberg Taskforce
- Vugesta
