= Gordion Furniture and Wooden Artifacts =

Artifacts excavated from royal burial mounds

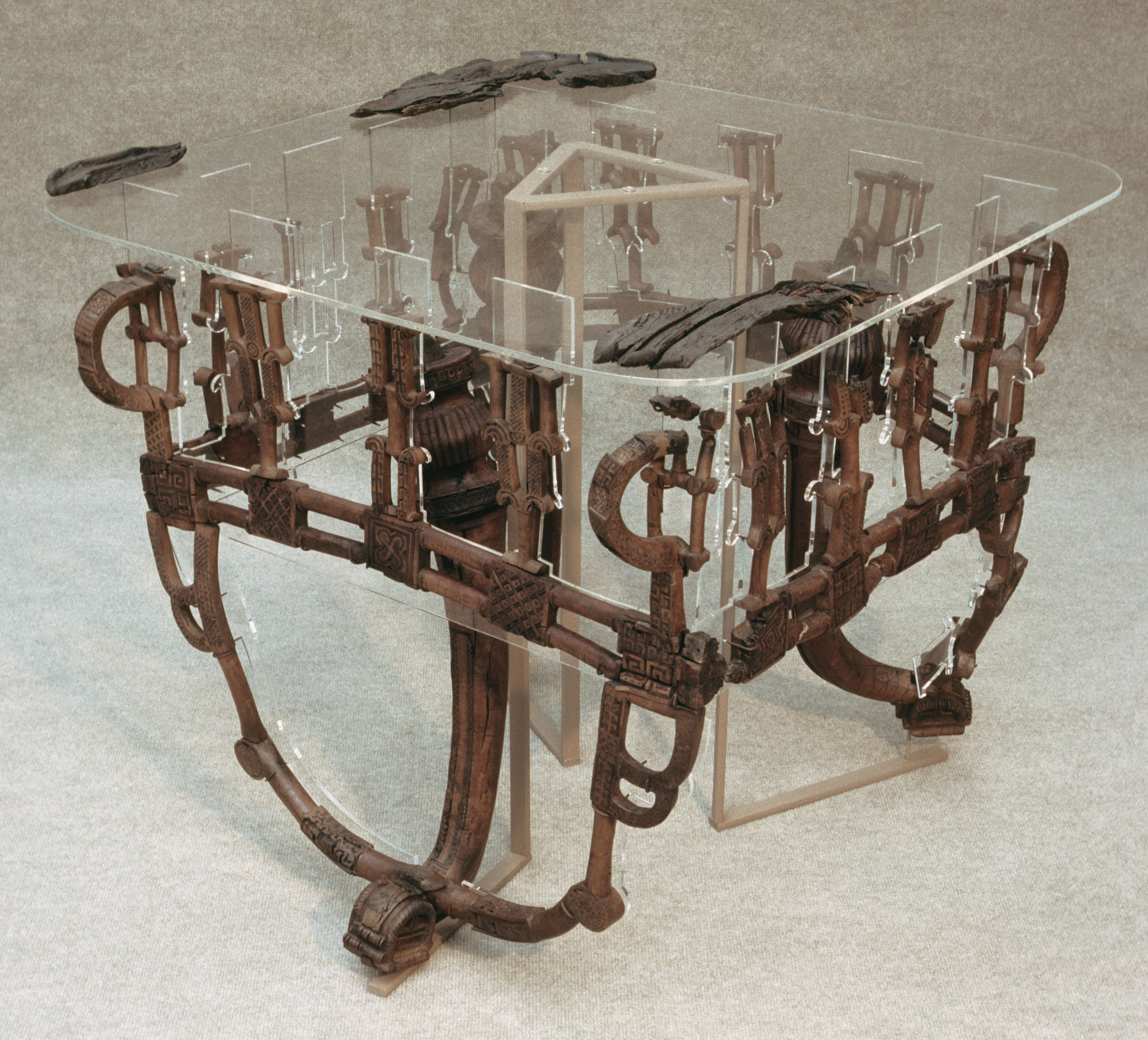
The inlaid table from Tumulus MM, Museum of Anatolian Civilizations, Ankara.

A spectacular collection of furniture and wooden artifacts was excavated by the University of Pennsylvania at the site of Gordion (Latin: Gordium), the capital of the ancient kingdom of Phrygia in the early first millennium BC. The best preserved of these works came from three royal burials, surviving nearly intact due to the relatively stable conditions that had prevailed inside the tomb chambers. The Gordion wooden objects are now recognized as the most important collection of wooden finds recovered from the ancient Near East.

The group comprises over 100 fine wooden artifacts, including tables, a bed, a throne, serving stands, stools, footstools, plates, spoons, boxes, a parasol, and 12 carved wooden animals. Several pieces of furniture are highly ornate, profusely inlaid with geometric patterns that exhibit sophisticated types of symmetry, and featuring designs that symbolize the Phrygian Mother Goddess Matar (Kybele). The furniture from the largest tomb at Gordion, Tumulus MM, is associated with King Midas, the powerful Phrygian ruler of the eighth century BC.

The wood has been conserved over a period of 30 years using innovative methods developed by an international team of conservators; these methods are now considered standard for the treatment of dry archaeological wood. The good state of preservation of the Gordion wooden objects has allowed scientists to identify the woods used and investigate their deterioration. Chemical analyses of the residues from the associated bronze vessels have indicated how the bronzes were used with the furniture - and have even determined the menu of a royal Phrygian funerary feast. Several of the most elaborate pieces have been mounted for display in the Museum of Anatolian Civilizations, Ankara, Turkey.

== Ancient wooden artifacts from Gordion ==
The central Anatolian site of Gordion was first excavated by Gustav and Alfred Körte in 1900 and then by Professor Rodney S. Young of the University of Pennsylvania in a major campaign between 1950 and 1973. Among the many exceptional Phrygian artifacts recovered were more than one hundred wooden objects dating to the eighth century BC—a rare find, since organic materials seldom survive in buried conditions. The wood discovered by the Körte brothers consisted mainly of furniture fragments from a tumulus burial (K-III), which were significant but too fragmentary to be well understood. Young’s excavations, however, produced a spectacular collection of wooden furniture and other types of objects, many of which were in relatively good condition.

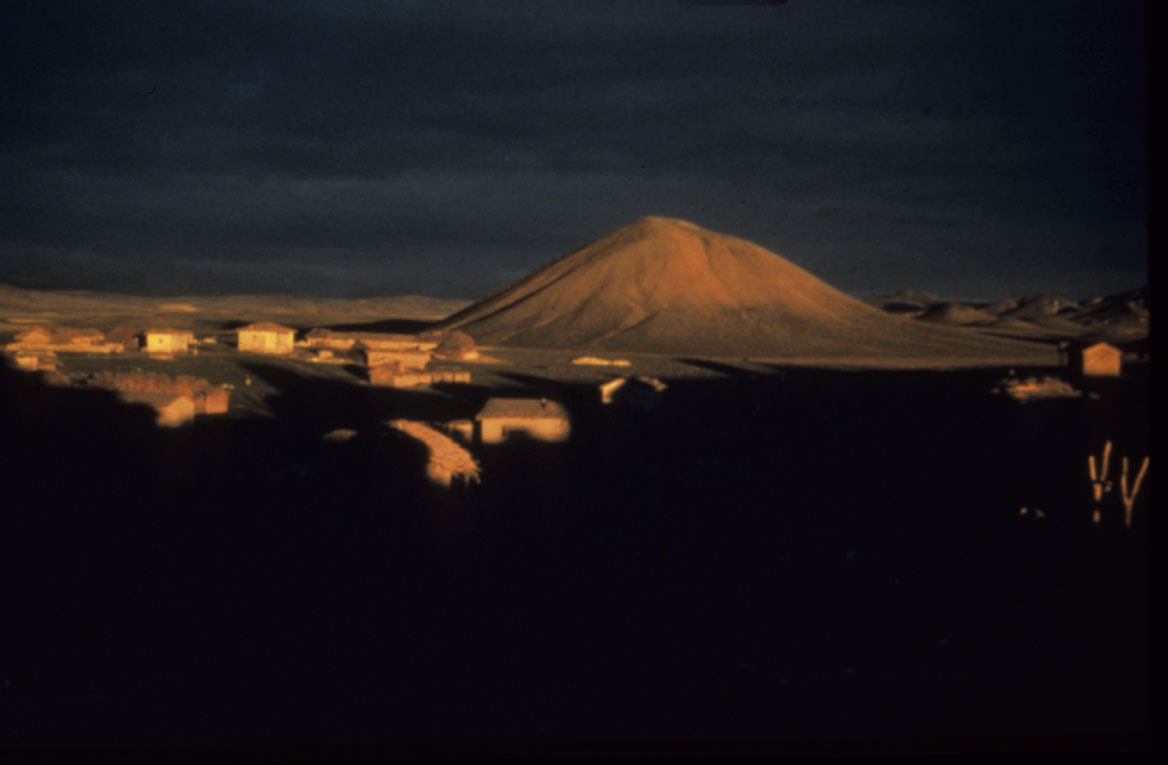
View of Tumulus MM at sunset.

These came mainly from three early royal tumuli (Tumulus MM, Tumulus P, and Tumulus W), along with carbonized remains from the destruction level of the city mound. Young died in 1974, before finishing his final report on the excavation of these tombs, but his monograph, Three Great Early Tumuli, The Gordion Excavations Final Reports, Volume 1, was published posthumously by a group of his colleagues, based on his original notes. Three Great Early Tumuli detailed the excavation of the burials and their grave goods in preliminary interpretations and working drawings. During the production of this volume, many of the early interpretations of the wooden artifacts were found to be incorrect, and a reassessment of the finds was begun by Dr. Elizabeth Simpson, now emeritus professor of ancient art and archaeology at the Bard Graduate Center, New York, NY.

In 1981, Simpson went to Turkey to photograph and draw the objects and discovered that the wood was deteriorating. lt was believed that this had been caused by water that seeped into the tomb as a result of drilling in order to determine the location of the chamber prior to excavation. A project to study and conserve the Gordion wooden artifacts was then organized under her direction with the support of the University of Pennsylvania Museum of Archaeology and Anthropology. Work has been carried out since that time by the Gordion Furniture Project team in the Museum of Anatolian Civilizations (Anadolu Medeniyetleri Müzesi), Ankara, Turkey. More than 40 archaeologists, conservators, scientists, and artists have been affiliated with the project since its inception, with funding from the National Endowment for the Humanities, the National Geographic Society, the 1984 Foundation, the Samuel H. Kress Foundation, the Getty Grant Program, and other foundations and individual donors. During the past 30 years, most of the wood has been conserved, and many of the objects have been reconstructed for display in the Museum of Anatolian Civilizations. The collection is now considered to be the largest and most important group of well-preserved ancient wooden artifacts excavated from the Near East.

== Tumulus MM ==
The king buried in Tumulus MM.

Rodney Young named the largest burial mound at the site Tumulus MM—for “Midas Mound,” after the famous Phrygian king Midas, who ruled at Gordion during the second half of the eighth century B.C. Young eventually came to believe that the tomb’s occupant was not Midas but rather his father, although in either case the wooden finds from the burial can be associated with King Midas. When Midas took the throne on the death of his father, he surely would have officiated at the funeral, with the grave goods provided by him for the deposition. The historical King Midas was a contemporary of the Assyrian king Sargon II (r. 721–705 BC) and was also well known to the Greeks. Midas was the first foreigner to make an offering at the sanctuary of Apollo at Delphi, according to the Greek historian Herodotus, who wrote that the king had dedicated his throne, which was “well worth seeing.” Unfortunately, this tantalizing comment tells us little about the appearance of the throne of Midas. However, the magnificent wooden furniture from Tumulus MM at Gordion suggests that the throne was likely made from beautiful woods with carved and inlaid decoration, including a complex of geometric patterns that reflected the power of the Phrygian royal house and its connection to the Phrygian mother goddess Matar (Kybele).

View of the Tumulus MM grave goods, 1957.

Tumulus MM produced an array of priceless artifacts: 170 bronze vessels, some with deposits of organic residues; 10 bronze-and-leather belts; more than 180 bronze fibulae (ancient safety pins); pottery vessels containing the remains of food; and 15 pieces of fine wooden furniture. The exact nature of the furniture was not clear to Young and his team when they entered the chamber in 1957, as many of the objects had broken along the lines of the joinery, with their constituent parts dispersed on the tomb floor. The first thing the excavators saw was the skeleton of the king lying on a mass of textiles, covering what Young thought was a four-poster bed. To the east of the “bed” were several furniture legs scattered among remnants of cloth. Leaning against the east wall were two ornate, inlaid objects, called “screens” by Young and initially identified as “throne backs.” To the south of these, a fancy inlaid table had collapsed with its frame intact, and nearby were the tops and legs of eight “plain” tables. Most of the bronze vessels found in the tomb had once been hung on the walls or placed on the tables, but all had fallen to the floor.

=== The inlaid table, Tumulus MM ===
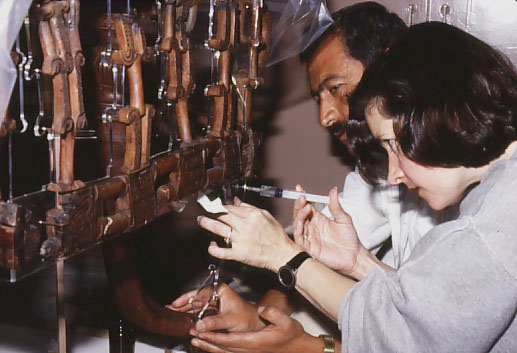
Elizabeth Simpson and Nazif Uygur constructing the Plexiglas mount for the inlaid table, 1989.

The inlaid table, called the “Pagoda Table” by Young because of its exotic design and decoration, was made of 46 separate components. The table had three legs, with lion-paw feet, and three structural supports that rose from the feet to prop up the frame at its corners. The four-sided frame was carved as a series of panels, connected by double bars, and inlaid with geometric patterns such as fields of squares or diamonds, configurations of hooks, rosette-like designs, and mazes. Some of these patterns appear elsewhere as markings on early figurines and clothing, and survive on women’s dowry textiles and ritual cloths in Europe and Anatolia up to the present. Evidence suggests that these designs were protective and empowering, with connotations of procreation and fertility.

The inlaid table was thus decorated with apotropaic and magical imagery, suggesting that it may have had a ritual function. It was also a practical, portable banquet table, with four handles and a tray-shaped top. Boxwood was used for the frame and legs, juniper for the inlay, and walnut for the table top. In 1983, the table was reconstructed for display in the Museum of Anatolian Civilizations, where it could be seen assembled for the first time in 2700 years. The mount was refurbished and the display reinstalled in 1989.

=== The plain tables, Tumulus MM ===
The other eight tables found in the tomb were simpler versions of the inlaid table. Each had three curved boxwood legs and a tray-shaped top. The tops of seven of the tables were made of walnut; the wood of the top of the eighth table was probably maple or cherry. Contrary to Young’s earlier supposition, the legs were not steam bent but were made from naturally curved or trained branches. Tenons at the tops of the legs were fit into “collars” that extended down from the lower surface of the table tops. Research has shown that this system of joinery was widespread in antiquity, attested in the Middle Bronze Age tombs of Jericho and in the Pazyryk burials of the fourth century BC.

=== The serving stands, Tumulus MM ===
The Tumulus MM serving stands, 1957.

Young's “screens” were made of boxwood, inlaid with juniper, with walnut top pieces and curved “legs” set into the front faces. At the center of each face was an inlaid rosette, supported by two curved legs with stylized lion-paw feet. These elements were set within a grid of inlaid square designs surrounded by thousands of tiny diamonds and triangles. Most of the square designs were symmetrical with respect to rotations of 180 degrees, which allowed several basic designs to be turned and flipped to form derivative versions, adding complexity and obscuring the underlying patterns in which the basic designs had been arranged. This surprising play with symmetry indicates that the Phrygian woodworkers were clever, imaginative artisans with a pronounced mathematical orientation.

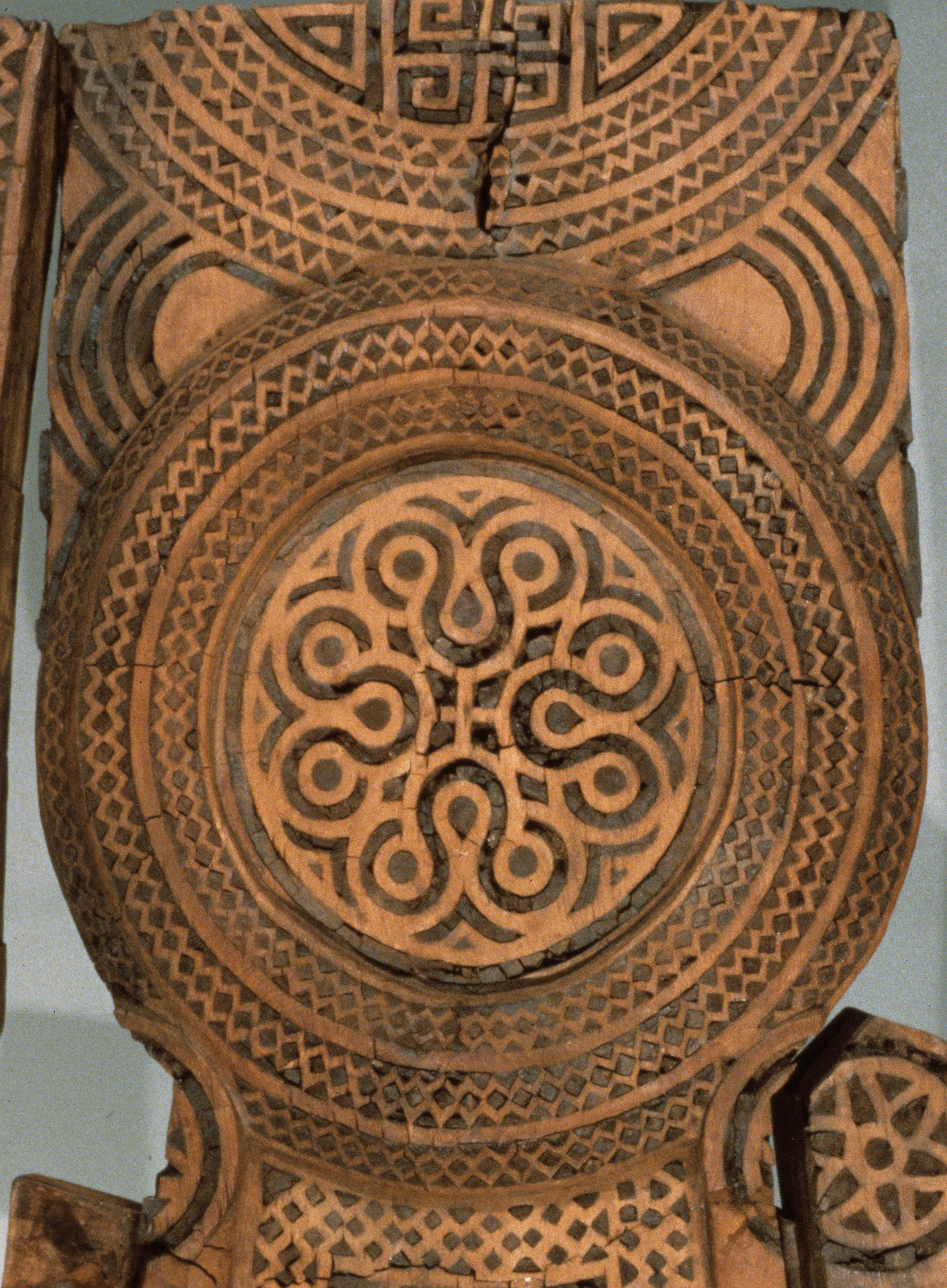
Central rosette, serving stand A.

This impression was confirmed by an analysis of the prominent designs at the center of the screen faces, which have now been identified as religious symbols. The rosette represented the Phrygian goddess Matar and the curved legs her two attendant lions, in an abstract version of the figures in the niche of Arslan Kaya, the monumental rock-cut shrine of the Phrygian highlands. The Tumulus MM screens thus took the form of portable shrines of the goddess Matar.

Each “screen” had a top piece, supported by a back leg and diagonal struts. Research has now shown that the “screens” were not “throne backs” but serving stands. The top pieces featured large wooden rings that had held small bronze cauldrons, ten of which were found nearby in the tomb. Also found near the stands were two bronze ladles, which had undoubtedly been used to transfer the contents of the cauldrons into other vessels. The Tumulus MM serving stands have been assembled for display in the Museum of Anatolian Civilizations.

Painting by Greg Harlin of the funeral ceremony before the Tumulus MM burial.

=== The king’s coffin, Tumulus MM ===
At the north of the chamber was the king’s “bed,” which has now been identified as an open log coffin, carved from a huge cedar log, with ledges extending out at both ends. Four large pine blocks had braced the coffin body, and inlaid rails were socketed into the sides. This new information led to a fuller understanding of the circumstances of the king’s burial. The remains of the coffin, as disposed on the tomb floor, showed that a funeral ceremony had taken place before the interment: the coffin had clearly been assembled elsewhere before the burial, then disassembled, and its parts placed in the chamber in something other than their original positions.

The contents of the tomb, which were largely banquet furnishings, must have been used for the ceremony. Analysis of the food and drink residues produced the menu of the funerary banquet. The feast included a spicy stew, made with barbecued sheep or goat, honey, wine, olive oil, and most likely lentils, seasoned with anise or fennel. The small bronze cauldrons that sat in the tops of the serving stands had contained a mixed fermented beverage of grape wine, barley beer, and honey mead. The beverage served at the king’s funeral has been reconstructed by Dogfish Head Brewery as the award-winning “Midas Touch,” which is now widely available. This collaborative research allowed the funeral ceremony before the burial to be reconstructed in a painting by Greg Harlin.

== Tumulus P ==
This rather complete picture has aided in the interpretation of the Tumulus P and Tumulus W burials. These tombs produced wonderful wooden finds, but they are largely fragmentary because the roofs of both chambers had collapsed, crushing the contents within. Tumulus P, excavated in 1956, covered the tomb of a small child, who was buried with bronze vessels, fibulae, and belts; iron implements; painted and monochrome pottery; and a glass bowl—as well as 21 or more pieces of furniture and 49 other wooden objects.

=== The serving stand, Tumulus P ===
The wood finds included a “screen,” which, like its Tumulus MM counterparts, was actually a serving stand. The top piece, back leg, and face of the stand were made of boxwood. The face was carved in openwork and inlaid with juniper and yew in a profusion of geometric patterns. As with the Tumulus MM serving stands, this stand too featured a large rosette at the center supported by abstract lion legs, suggesting that it had also represented a shrine of the Phrygian goddess Matar.

=== The inlaid, studded stool, Tumulus P ===
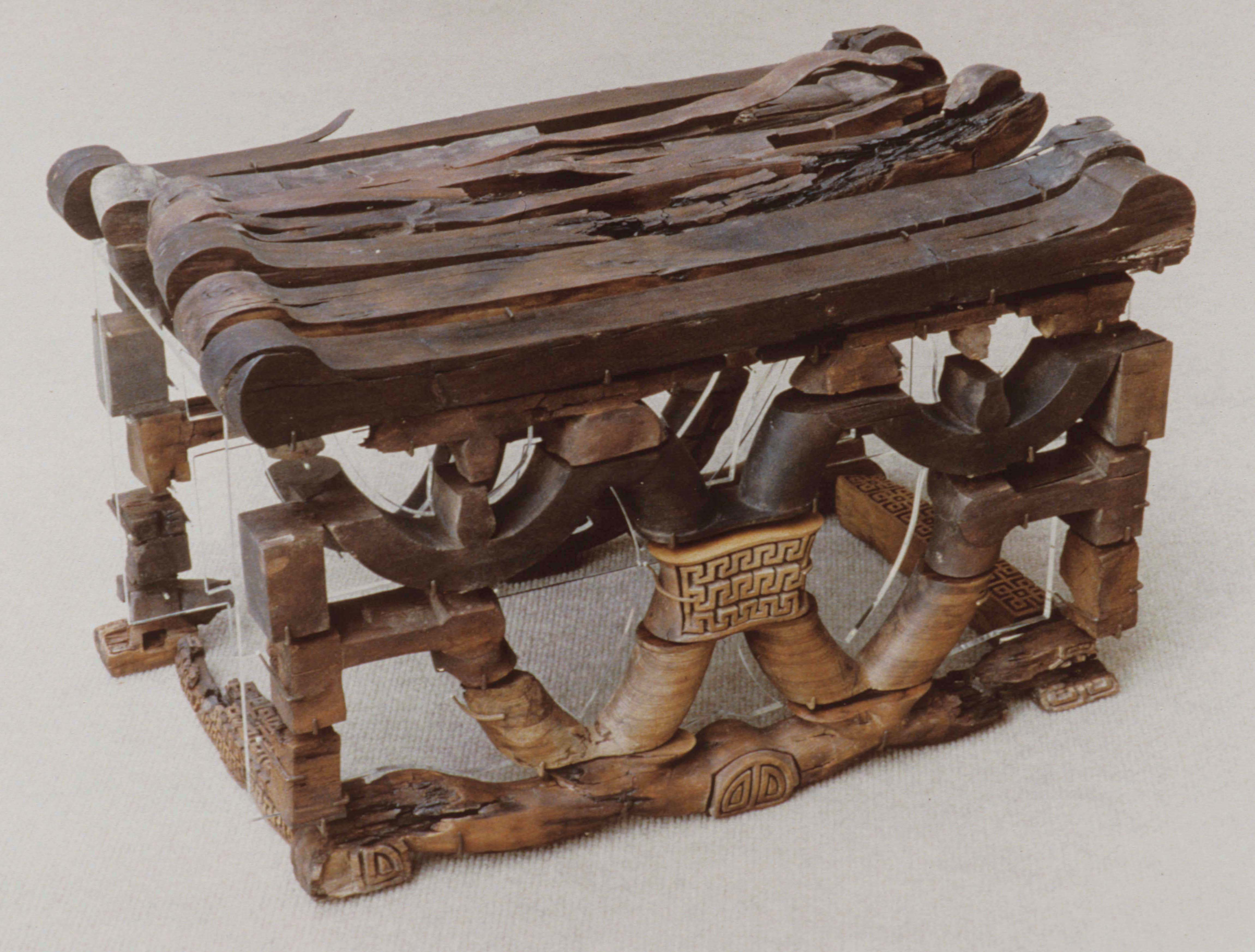
The Tumulus P stool reconstructed for display.

Found near the stand in the southwest corner of the tomb were pieces of a carved wooden stool, inlaid in geometric patterns and studded with bronze tacks. The stool was a colorful production, assembled from alternating strips of boxwood and yew. The boxwood strips, where inlaid, were inlaid with yew, and one yew strip was inlaid with boxwood. The two faces were joined at the top by undecorated strips, and at the bottom by two stretchers, carved on their top and outer faces. The stool was reconstructed on a Plexiglas mount (1993) and is now on display in the Museum of Anatolian Civilizations.

The design of this stool is unusual, and can only be understood in reference to the Tumulus MM inlaid table. The two faces of the stool were conceived with such a table in mind, representing the main features of the three-dimensional table “collapsed” into two dimensions in a clever intellectual conceit. Not content with this amusing play with form and dimension, the cabinetmakers then negated the force of the metaphor by alternating the colored woods, producing the impression of a series of dark and light stripes.

=== Other furniture and wooden artifacts from Tumulus P ===
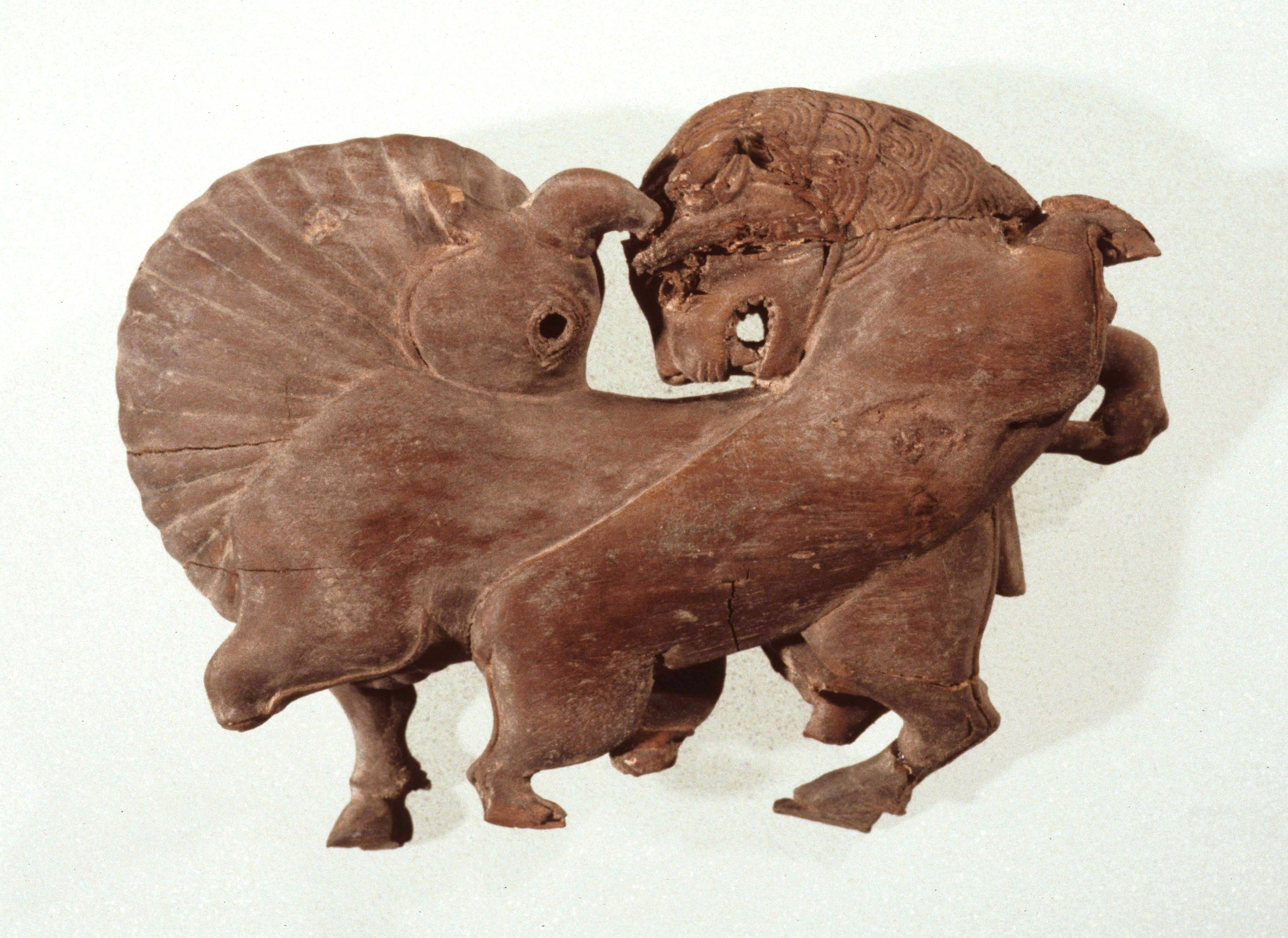
Animal combat, Tumulus P.

Many other interesting pieces of furniture were recovered from the Tumulus P burial. The “Tripod Tray Table,” found at the north of the chamber, was named for its massive, boxwood tray-shaped top. The table had three curved legs, each with a stylized lion-paw foot and a large ring at the top. Nearby were the remains of another fancy table, called the “Mosaic Table” by Young because of its boldly inlaid table top. The top was made of boxwood boards, joined edge to edge and inlaid with strips of yew in a pattern of squares and crosses. Also found in the tomb were two plain tables, six or more stools, two footstools, a small chair or throne, and a carved and inlaid bed. Other wooden finds include a parasol, a box, eight spoons or ladles, and 23 plates and bowls. Among the most charming of the wooden objects from Tumulus P are 12 small animals, including two lions, a lion and bull in combat, a griffin eating a fish, two bulls, and a leaping ram or goat—toys for the tomb’s young royal occupant.

== Tumulus W ==
Tumulus W screen, 1959.

The Tumulus W burial, excavated in 1959, contained bronze and pottery vessels, bronze fibulae, a bronze-and-leather belt, and fragments of several wooden objects. These included the remnants of a “screen,” which was apparently a serving stand like those from the Tumulus MM and Tumulus P burials. Its front face was carved in openwork and studded with bronze tacks. Although the “screen” is only partially preserved, it had clearly been an extraordinary piece of furniture. Five or more wooden plates from the tomb are of particular interest because of their method of manufacture. Close examination has revealed tool marks indicating that the plates were made on an ancient reciprocating lathe—the earliest evidence for the lathe from a securely dated archaeological context.

== The City Mound ==
The destruction level of the city mound yielded carbonized fragments of what may be a serving stand, an inlaid table, and other elaborate pieces of furniture, fitted with bronze studs and brackets as well as finely carved ivory plaques. Recent scientific advances have allowed the charcoal to be identified, indicating that boxwood, maple, yew, oak, and pine are present. Research into the form of the city mound objects is currently underway; consolidation of the carbonized wood has been deemed inadvisable and will not be undertaken.

== Research, conservation, and scientific analyses ==
Conservation of the wooden artifacts from Gordion has been ongoing since 1981, initiated by Robert Payton, now conservator at the Museum of London. Since 1990, work has been carried out by a team of conservators, conservation scientists, preparators, and graduate student interns in the Museum of Anatolian Civilizations, Ankara, under the direction of Professor Krysia Spirydowicz, Queen's University, Kingston, Ontario. The preservation method developed by Payton was adapted and refined to treat over 40 pieces of furniture and more than 50 wooden objects from the three tumuli at Gordion. Study of the artifacts revealed that the wood was very fragile when handled. Since the wood was very light in weight and retained little of its original cellular structure, consolidation was necessary in order to strengthen the wood, using a dilute solution of Butvar B-98, a synthetic polymer based on polyvinyl butyral. The same polymer was utilized in more concentrated form to carry out repairs; for particularly fragmentary objects, glass microspheres were added to the solution to make a paste for filling gaps and reinforcing joins.

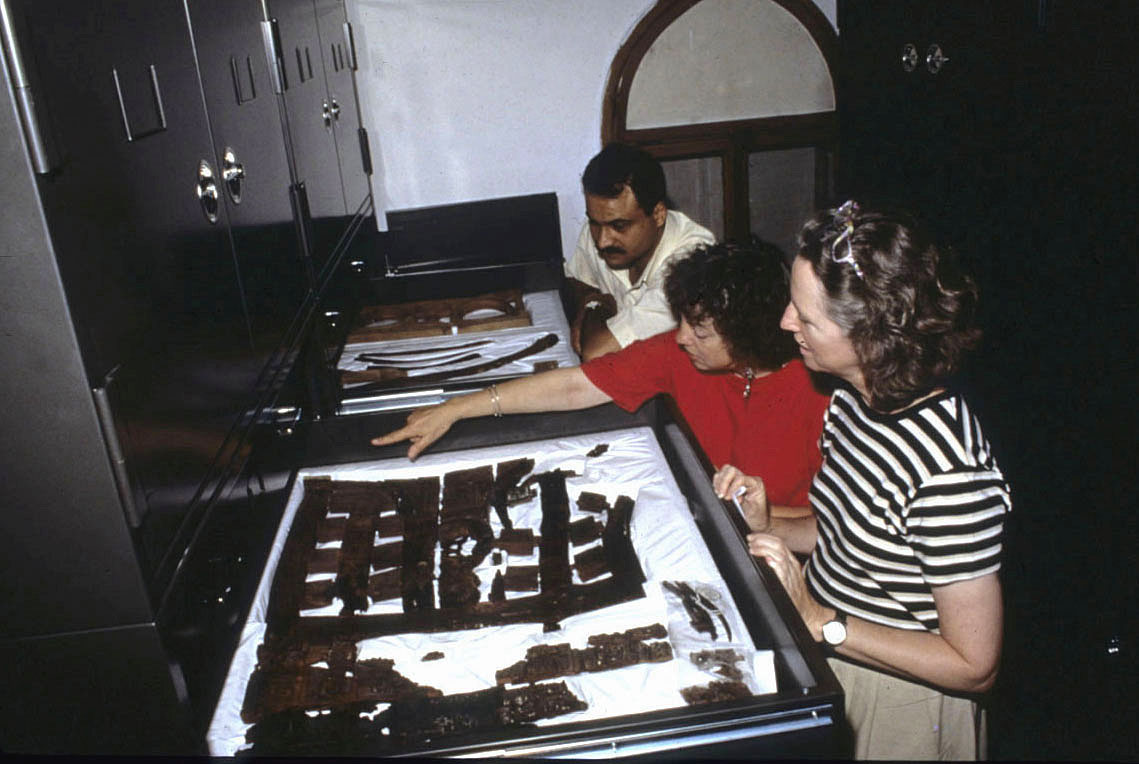
Conservators Latif Özen, Krysia Spirydowicz, and Nancy Love, with the Tumulus P stand in storage, Museum of Anatolian Civilizations, Ankara.

A wood species analysis was begun in 1983 by Professor Burhan Aytuğ of Istanbul University, and is now under the direction of Professor Robert Blanchette, Department of Wood Pathology, University of Minnesota. Robert Blanchette is also supervising a wood pathology analysis, which aims to understand the types of degradation present in the wood and the causes of the decay. The graffiti on the serving stands from Tumulus MM have been studied by Professor Lynn Roller, University of California, Davis. The textiles associated with the furniture from Tumulus MM are the subject of a collaborative research project carried out at the Museum Conservation Institute, Smithsonian Institution, headed by Mary Ballard. The menu of the funerary feast that took place before the Tumulus MM burial was determined by Dr. Patrick McGovern and his colleagues, and the mixed fermented beverage was created through the efforts of Pat McGovern and Sam Calagione of Dogfish Head Brewery.

Research on the wooden objects from the Gordion tombs is the subject of numerous publications (see References below for a selection). Thirty years of study have yielded extensive information about the woods, tools, and techniques used by the royal cabinetmakers, who were surely among the greatest craftsmen of their time. The Phrygian artisans, while working well within ancient traditions of wood carving and joinery, are renowned for their wood inlay work, their abstraction of natural forms, and their elaborate play with symmetry and design.
