= Hector Charles Bywater =

- Born: 21 October 1884 London, UK
- Died: 16 or 17 August 1940
- Notable works: The Great Pacific War

Hector Charles Bywater (21 October 1884 in London – 16 or 17 August 1940 in London) was a British journalist and military writer.

== Biography ==
Bywater was the second son of a middle class Welshman. The family had emigrated into the United States in 1901. At age of 19 he started part-time job writing naval articles for the New York Herald and later was sent as foreign correspondent to London. There he became a naval spy for Britain. Naturally gifted with languages, he could pass for a native German. In 1915, he was sent back to America to investigate suspicious activity on New York's docks and apocryphally averted an attempted German bombing. Years later, he returned to London to analyze naval data and documents.

In his 1921 book Sea-power in the Pacific : a study of the American-Japanese naval problem, he predicted naval conflict between Imperial Japan and the United States and expanded the topic further in 1925 book The Great Pacific War. Here Bywater correctly predicted many actions of the Japanese and the Americans, including the Japanese drive to win the "Decisive Battle" and the US island-hopping campaign.

Contrary to popular belief, neither book predicted an aerial attack on Pearl Harbor. Instead, he predicted that the aerial attack would occur in US-colonized Philippines, then having the largest concentration of US naval vessels in the Pacific.

The book was translated into Japanese and read by senior officers of the Japanese Imperial Navy.

H. C. Bywater died just over a year before the attack on Pearl Harbor. He died of "undetermined causes" according to the hospital coroner's report, but no autopsy was ever performed.

After World War II, many military leaders in both the Allied Powers and Imperial Japan confirmed that Bywater's The Great Pacific War was a key resource book in planning military strategy during the war. To this day, first edition printings of the book in either English and Japanese are highly sought after by collectors.

== Works ==
- Archibald Hurd (1869–1959) and H. C. Bywater: From Heligoland to Keeling Island : one hundred days of naval war, Hodder and Stoughton, London, 1914.
- H. C. Bywater: Sea-power in the Pacific : a study of the American-Japanese naval problem, Constable, London, 1921.
- H. C. Bywater: The Great Pacific War: a history of the American-Japanese campaign of 1931-33, Constable, London, 1925. Published again in Boston, 1942 as The great Pacific war : a historic prophecy now being fulfilled.
- H. C. Bywater: Navies and nations : a review of naval developments since the Great War, Constable, London, 1927.
- H. C. Bywater: A searchlight on the Navy, Constable, London, 1934.
- H. C. Bywater and Herbert Cecil Ferraby (1884–1942): Strange intelligence : memoirs of naval secret service , London, 1934.
- H. C. Bywater: Cruisers in battle : naval 'light cavalry' under fire, 1914-1918, Constable, London, 1939.
