= Elizabeth Simpson (archaeologist) =

Archaeologist, art historian, illustrator

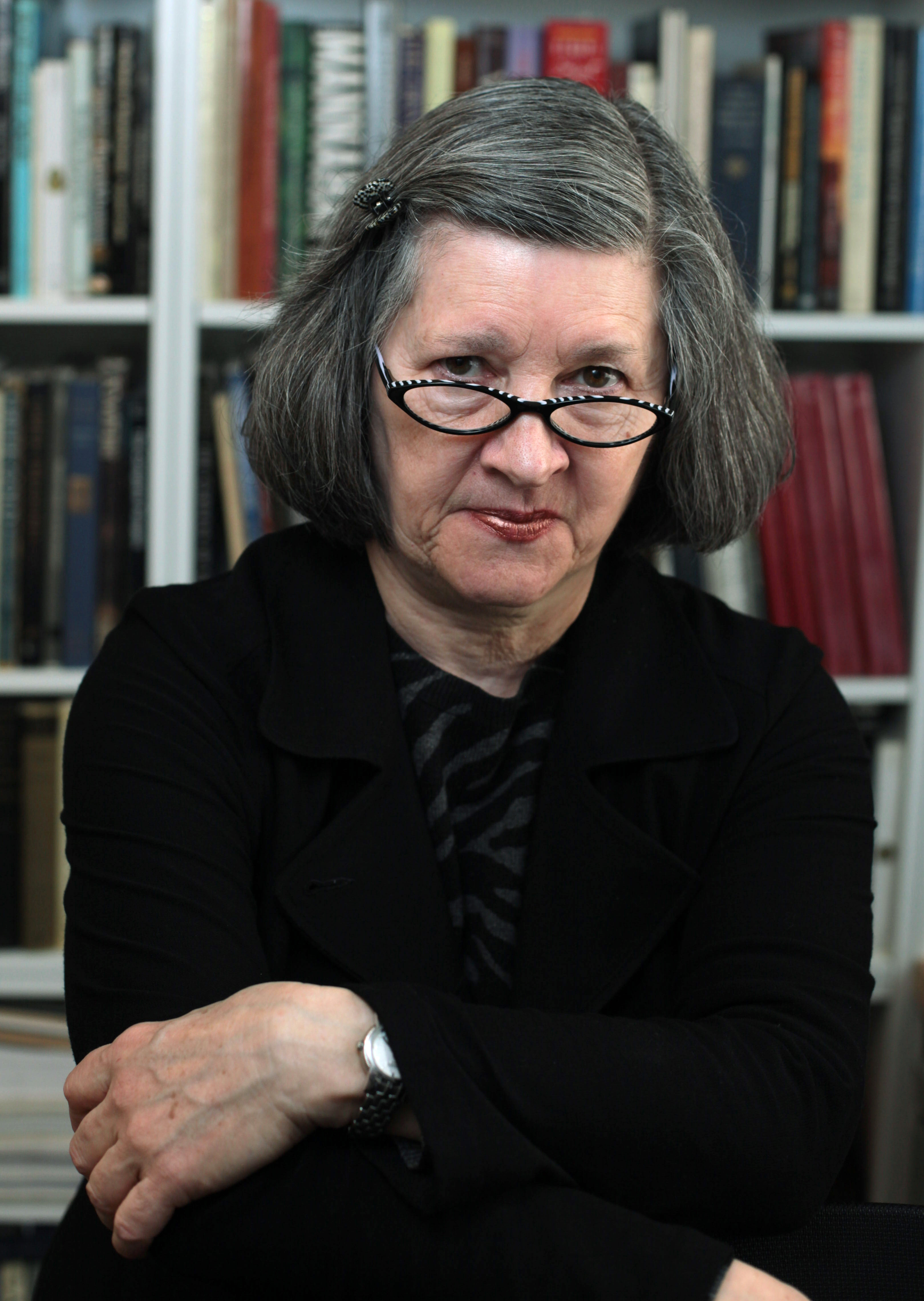
Elizabeth Simpson

Elizabeth Simpson (born 1947) is an archaeologist, art historian, illustrator, and professor emerita at the Bard Graduate Center, New York, NY, where she taught for 25 years. She is director of the project to study, conserve, and publish the large collection of rare wooden artifacts from Gordion, Turkey, which date to the eighth century BC. In this capacity, she is a consulting scholar in the Mediterranean Section, University of Pennsylvania Museum of Archaeology and Anthropology, Philadelphia. She received her PhD in classical archaeology from the University of Pennsylvania in 1985.

== Research and projects ==
Simpson specializes in the arts and technology of the ancient world, including the history of furniture, jewelry and metalwork, and ceramics and glass. Her research centers on archaeological detective work and the interpretation of objects that have not been well understood. This includes the reinterpretation of the furniture and wooden artifacts from Gordion, which are now in the Museum of Anatolian Civilizations, Ankara, as well as the famous Pratt Ivories in the Metropolitan Museum of Art, New York. She solved a 100-year-old mystery regarding the identity of the Andokides Painter, the fine red-figure artist who painted a series of bilingual vases in Athens in the late 6th century BC.

Simpson is a former curator in the Department of Ancient Near Eastern Art at the Metropolitan Museum of Art, New York, and the recipient of grants from the National Endowment for the Humanities, the American Council of Learned Societies, the National Geographic Society, the Samuel H. Kress Foundation, the Getty Grant Program, and the Archaeological Institute of America. In 1995, she organized a ground-breaking symposium at the Bard Graduate Center, "The Spoils of War—World War II and Its Aftermath: The Loss, Reappearance, and Recovery of Cultural Property". This led to a reorganization of priorities at museums throughout the world, with an emphasis on provenance research and the ethical acquisition of works of art. In 1998, she received an award from the Ministry of Culture of the Turkish Republic for the protection of Turkish cultural heritage.

== Selected publications ==
- Simpson, E. (ed.) The Adventure of the Illustrious Scholar: Papers Presented to Oscar White Muscarella. Leiden: Brill, 2018.
- Simpson, E. "An Early Anatolian Ivory Chair: The Pratt Ivories in the Metropolitan Museum of Art." In Amilla: The Quest for Excellence. Studies Presented to Guenter Kopcke in Celebration of His 75th Birthday. Edited by R. B. Koehl, 221-261. Philadelphia: INSTAP Academic Press, 2013.
- Simpson, E. "Royal Phrygian Furniture and Fine Wooden Artifacts from Gordion." In The Archaeology of Phrygian Gordion, Royal City of Midas. Edited by C. B. Rose, 149-164. Philadelphia: University of Pennsylvania Museum of Archaeology and Anthropology, 2012.
- Simpson, E. The Gordion Wooden Objects, Volume 1: The Furniture from Tumulus MM. Leiden: Brill, 2010.
- Simpson, E. "The Andokides Painter and Greek Carpentry." In Essays in Honor of Dietrich von Bothmer. Edited by A. Clark and J. Gaunt, 303-16. Amsterdam: Allard Pierson Museum, 2002.
- Simpson, E. "Celebrating Midas: Contents of a Great Phrygian King's Tomb Reveal a Lavish Funerary Banquet." Archaeology 54, no. 4 (2001): 26-33.
- Simpson, E. Simpson, Elizabeth. "Early Evidence for the Use of the Lathe in Antiquity". In Meletemata: Studies in Aegean Archaeology Presented to Malcolm H. Wiener. Edited by P. Betancourt, et al., 781-85. Liège and Austin: Université de Liège and University of Texas, 1999.
- Simpson, E. and K. Spirydowicz. Gordion Wooden Furniture: The Study, Conservation and Reconstruction of the Furniture and Wooden Objects from Gordion, 1981-1998. (English and Turkish). Ankara: Museum of Anatolian Civilizations, 1999.
- Simpson, E. (ed.) The Spoils of War—World War II and its Aftermath: The Loss, Reappearance, and Recovery of Cultural Property. New York: Harry N. Abrams, Inc., 1997. (Book-of-the-Month Club, Book-of-theMonth Club International, History Book Club, and Quality Paperback Book Club).
- Simpson, E. "The Phrygian Artistic Intellect." Source 7, nos. 3/4 (1988): 24-42.
