= Theft of medieval art from Quedlinburg =

1945 art theft in Quedlinburg, Germany

Coordinates: 51°47′09″N 11°08′13″E

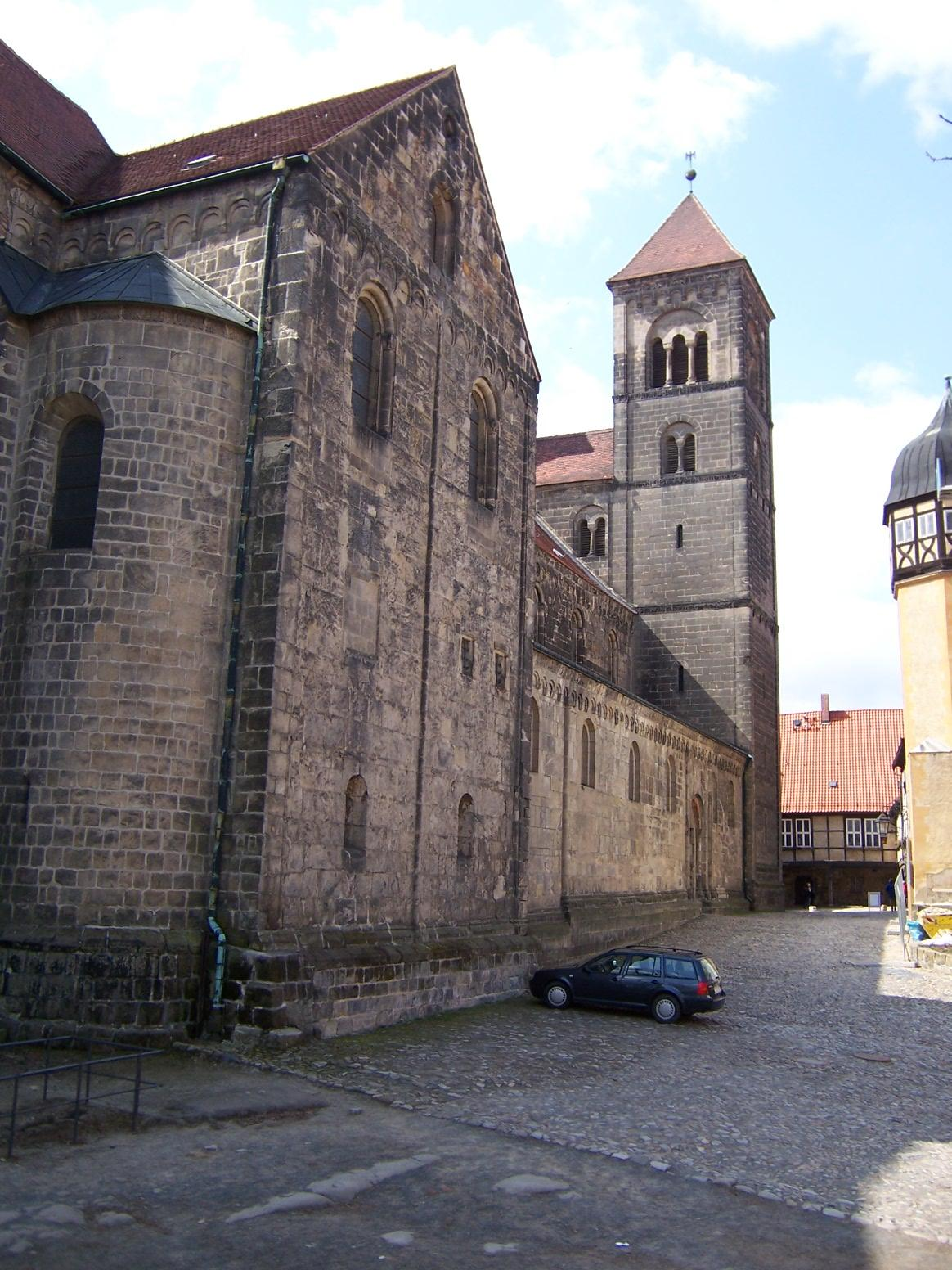
The former collegiate church of Quedlinburg Abbey, now the Lutheran church of St. Servatius, from which the artifacts were taken

The theft of medieval art from Quedlinburg was perpetrated by United States Army Lieutenant Joe T. Meador in the days prior to the end of World War II in Europe. Precious church objects stored near Quedlinburg, Germany, were found by the U.S. Army. They were placed under guard, but eight extremely valuable objects went missing, including a 9th-century illuminated manuscript gospel book, the Samuhel Evangeliar (English: Samuhel Gospel), and a printed evangeliary (book of gospel readings for services) dating to 1513 (the Evangelistar aus St. Wiperti), both with jewelled book-covers, as well as reliquaries, an ivory liturgical comb, a perfume-flask made out of rock crystal and other irreplaceable artifacts of historical importance.

The most famous illuminated manuscript associated with the town, the 5th-century Quedlinburg Itala fragment, once in the church, had been moved to a museum in Berlin and was not stolen.

The missing artifacts started resurfacing in 1987. After various lawsuits against and negotiations with the heirs of the by-then deceased Meador, they were restored to their rightful owners. William Honan, an author and journalist working for The New York Times, published in 1997 an account of the theft and how he traced it to the Meador family. Art researcher Willi Korte was significantly involved in this, as was Quedlinburg pastor Friedemann Goßlau.

== Theft ==
Quedlinburg Abbey was founded as a proprietary church of the Ottonian Imperial family by Emperor Otto the Great in 936, as a memorial to his father. Over the following centuries, it accumulated a rich collection of treasures donated by the Imperial family. At the Protestant Reformation, it was converted into the Lutheran Church of St. Servatius.

During World War II, the treasure was moved for security to a mineshaft southwest of the town. On April 19, 1945, the cache was found by a unit of the advancing U.S. Army, the 87th Armored Field Artillery Battalion, and placed under guard. In June, church authorities complained that eight precious objects were missing. However, investigations proved futile and the matter was dropped in 1949 because, by then, Quedlinburg was part of East Germany.

First Lieutenant Meador was a member of the 87th. Before the war, in 1938, Meador had received a bachelor's degree from North Texas State University, majoring in art, so he would have had a better appreciation than most of the value of the find. Several of his fellow soldiers reported seeing him entering the mine and leaving with bundles. Letters he wrote to his family indicate he mailed at least several of the objects home to Whitewright, Texas.

== Sale and lawsuits ==
Although Meador occasionally showed the art to his co-workers, he made no attempt to sell it. Upon his death from cancer on February 1, 1980, his will made no mention of the artwork.

Jane Meador Cook and Jack Meador, Joe's sister and brother, sold the Samuhel Gospel to the Cultural Foundation of the States, an organization based in Berlin and dedicated to repatriating lost German art, for $3 million. The transaction was finalized on May 9, 1990.

However, news of the sale resulted in a civil lawsuit brought in U.S. District Court on behalf of the Quedlinburg church on June 18, 1990. Negotiations led to an agreement that the Meador family would be paid either $2.75 million (less the 1990 payments) or $1 million for the return of all the artifacts.

The U.S. government chose to press charges. On January 4, 1996, Jack Meador, Jane Cook, and their lawyer, John Torigian, were indicted for "conspiring to receive, possess, conceal, store, barter, sell and dispose of stolen goods and for receiving, possessing, concealing, storing, bartering, selling and disposing of stolen goods." However, on October 22, 1996, the charges were dismissed by the District Court because they had been brought too late under the statute of limitations.

Afterward, the Internal Revenue Service investigated and sought over $50 million in taxes, penalties, and interest. On April 20, 2000, the IRS and the Meador family settled for $135,000.
