= Tornadoes of 2023 =

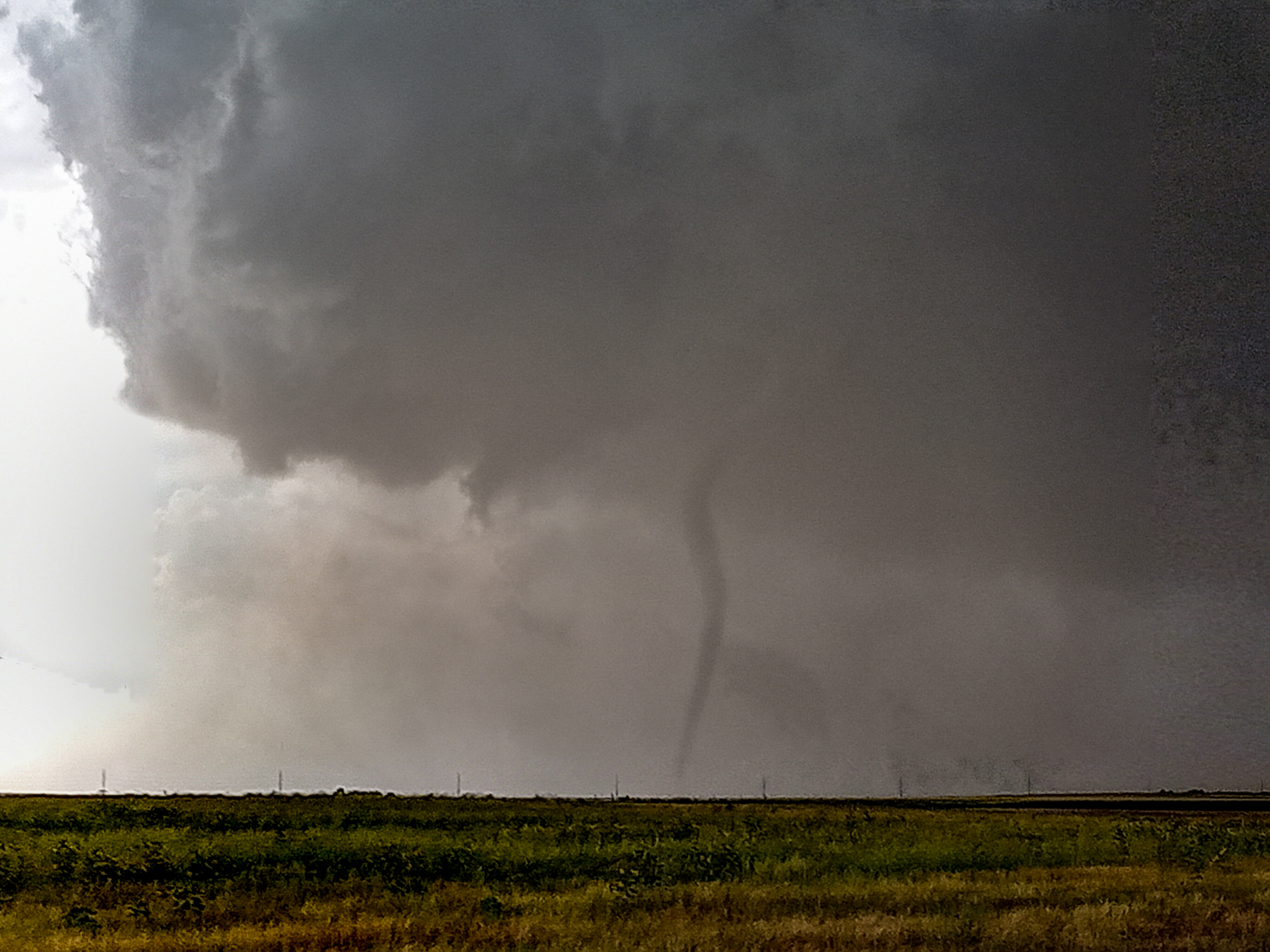
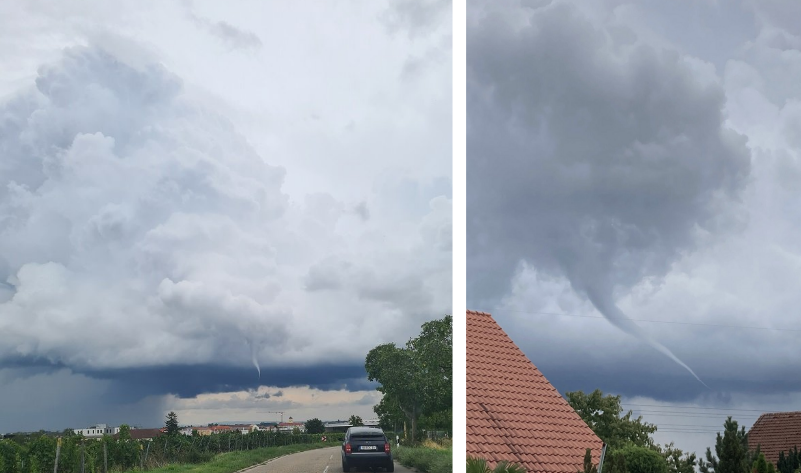
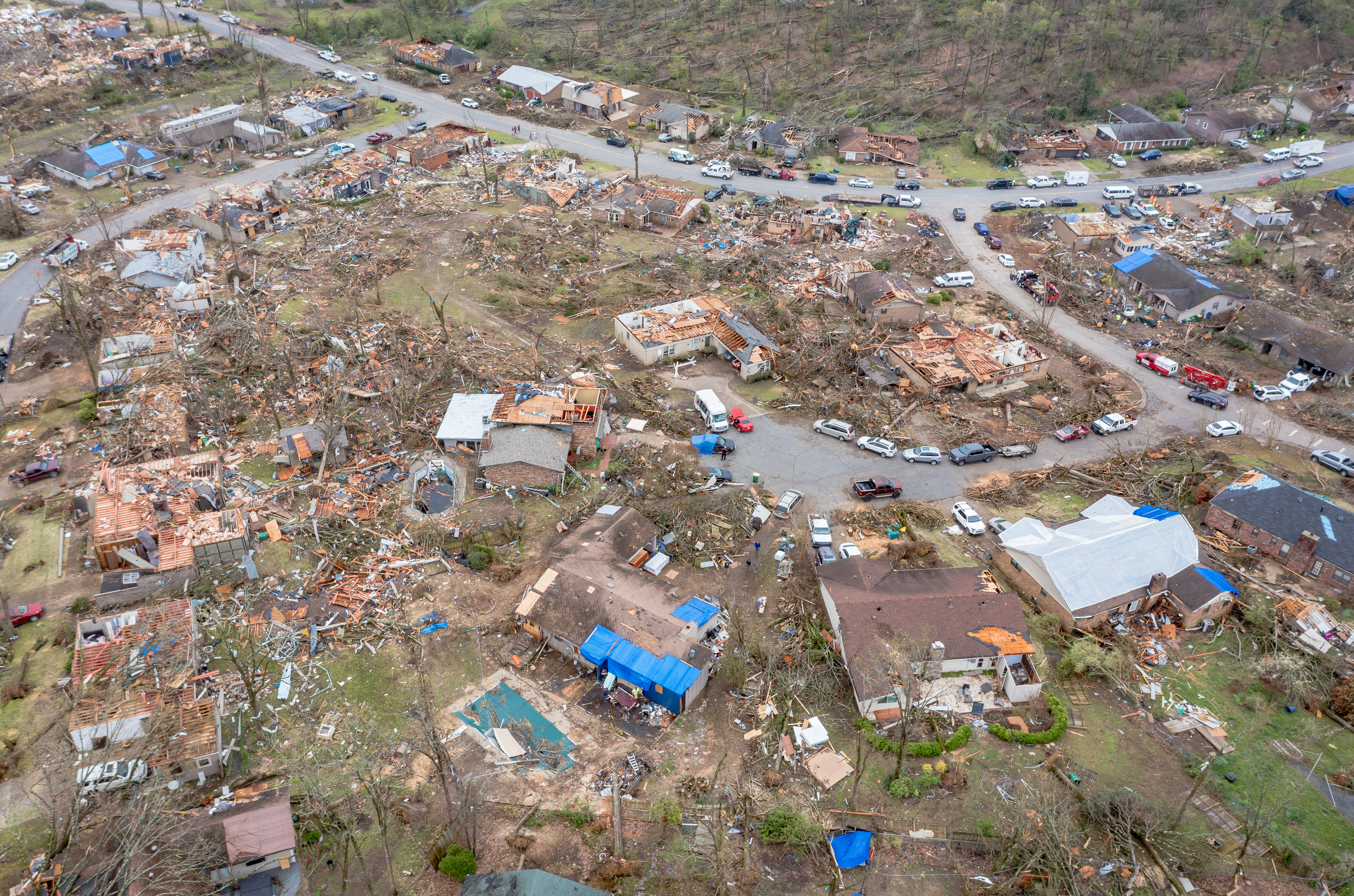
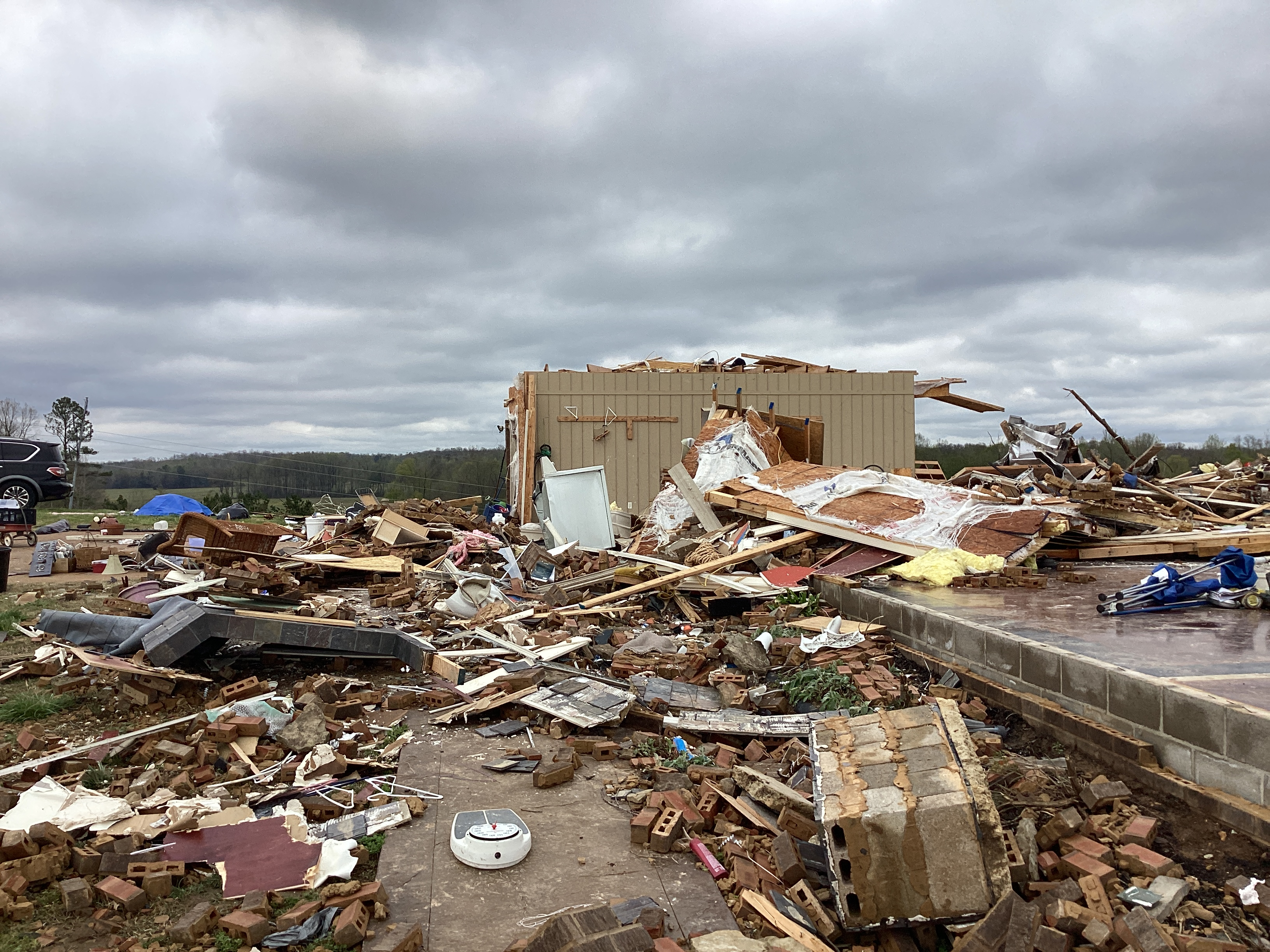
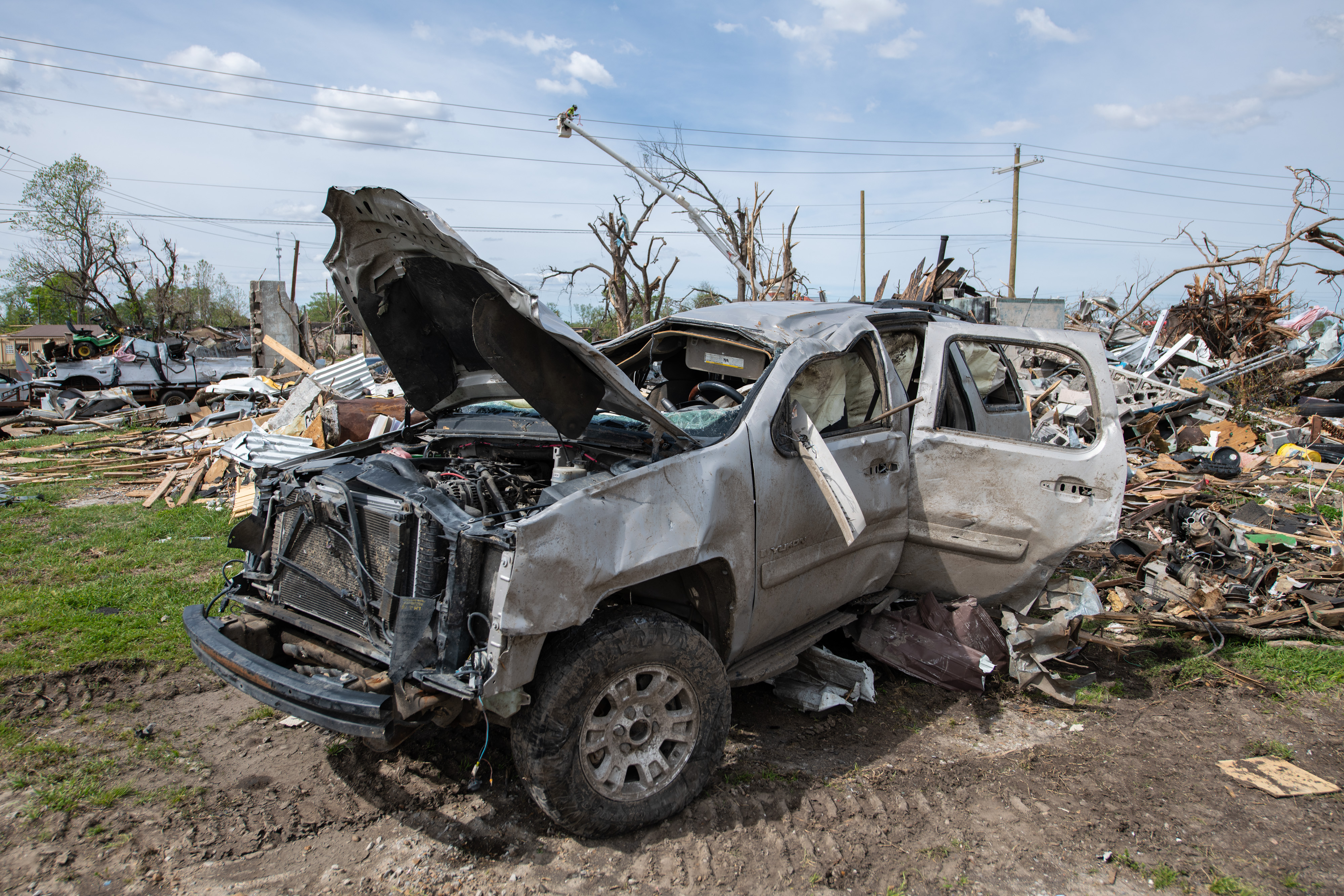
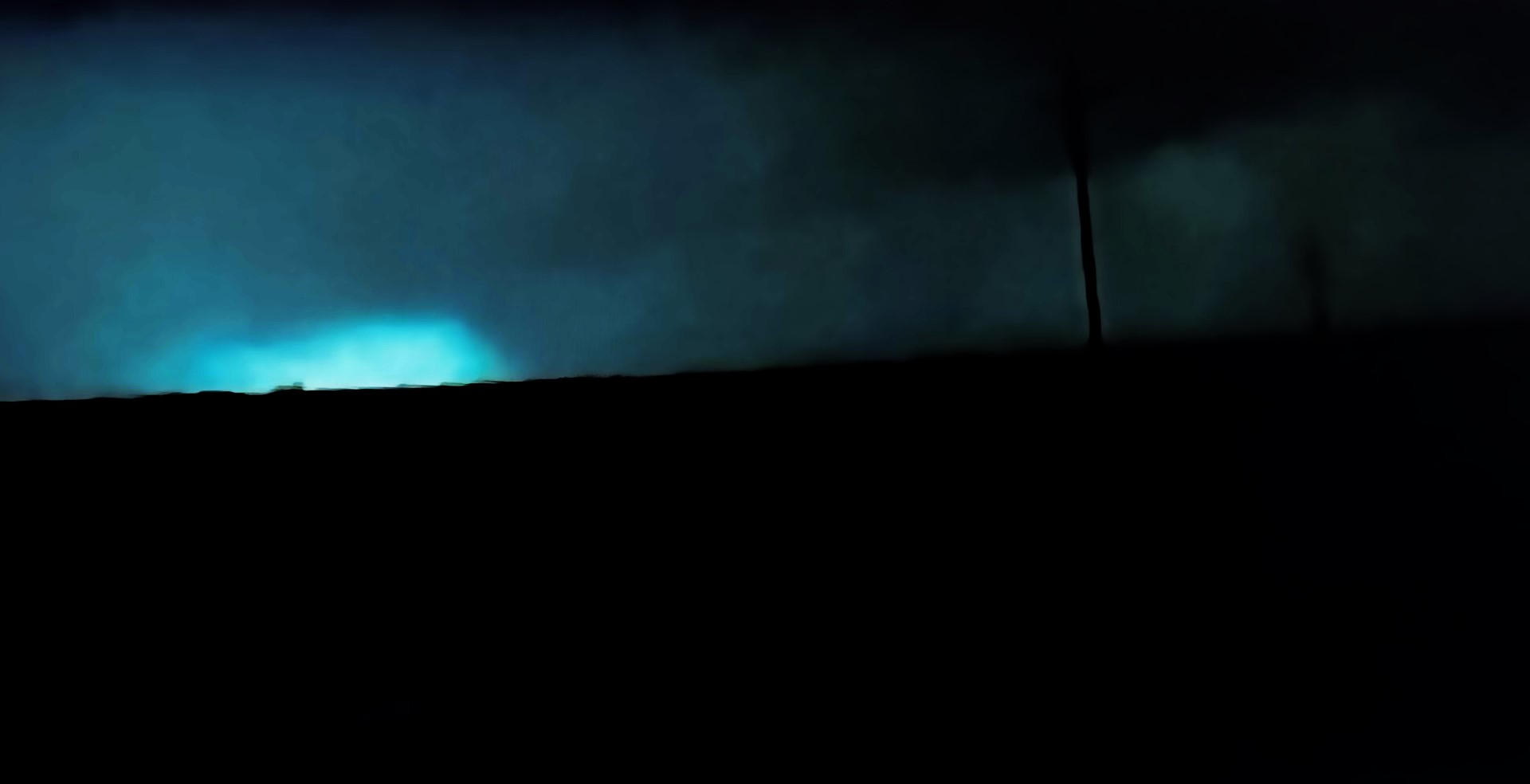
- Clockwise from top: An EF3 tornado near Yuma, Colorado on August 8; An aerial view of damaged homes in Little Rock, Arkansas after a tornado on March 31; Heavy damage to a truck following a high-end EF4 tornado that hit Rolling Fork, Mississippi on March 24; An EF2 tornado near Cheyenne, Oklahoma on February 26; EF3 tornado damage to a poorly anchored home near Adamsville, Tennessee following a tornado outbreak from late March to early April; An IF0 tornado in Rhineland-Palatinate, Germany.
- Timespan: January 2 – December 19
- Maximum rated tornado: EF4 tornado: Rolling Fork, Mississippi on March 24; Keota, Iowa on March 31; Didsbury, Alberta on July 1
- Tornadoes in U.S.: 1,379
- Fatalities (U.S.): 83
- Fatalities (worldwide): 117

This page documents notable tornadoes and tornado outbreaks worldwide in 2023. Strong, destructive tornadoes form most frequently in the United States, Argentina, Brazil, Bangladesh and East India, but can occur almost anywhere. Tornadoes develop occasionally in southern Canada during the Northern Hemisphere's summer, and at other times of the year across Europe, Asia, Argentina, Australia and New Zealand. They are often accompanied by other forms of severe weather, including thunderstorms, strong winds, and large hail. Worldwide, 117 tornado-related deaths were confirmed – 83 in the United States, 12 in China, nine in Indonesia, eight in Myanmar, three in Turkey, and one each in Brazil and Saudi Arabia.

January had the third-highest number of tornado watches and confirmed tornadoes of any January on record in the United States, behind 2017 and 1999. The first two months of the year had the fourth-highest number of confirmed tornadoes for the first 59 days of any year on record.

The year was deadlier than average, with a number of fatal tornadoes. By April 5, 63 tornado-related deaths were recorded in the United States; this was almost three times higher than 2022's total of 23 fatalities, approaching the annual average of roughly 70 deaths (17 of which came from a single EF4 tornado in Mississippi on March 24). Below-average tornadic activity occurred in May; however, active weather patterns spawned damaging tornado outbreaks throughout the summer, resulting in 12 additional fatalities. Damaging tornadoes also affected parts of Canada during that time, including the country's first violent tornado since 2018 (on July 1). Tornadic activity decreased abruptly in September, and tornadoes were almost non-existent during much of the autumn. Most Atlantic tropical cyclones missed the United States during the peak of hurricane season, with few early-season frontal systems; however, an intense outbreak in December produced 18 tornadoes, causing seven fatalities, all 7 of which occurred in Tennessee.

Several European organizations, including the European Severe Storms Laboratory and Deutscher Wetterdienst, officially began publishing and using the new International Fujita scale in late July 2023. The first major tornado outbreak using the scale occurred three months later, when Storm Ciarán affected much of Europe.

== Events ==
=== United States ===
There were 1,423 reported tornadoes and 1,379 confirmed tornadoes in the United States in 2023.

Confirmed tornadoes by Enhanced Fujita rating
EFU	EF0	EF1	EF2	EF3	EF4	EF5	Total
308	463	447*	130	29	2	0	1,379

- Note: An EFU tornado from the United States crossed into Canada, where that portion of the track was rated EF1. This is counted as an EF1 tornado since it is one continuous tornado.

A map of 2023 United States tornado paths from the results of storm surveys.

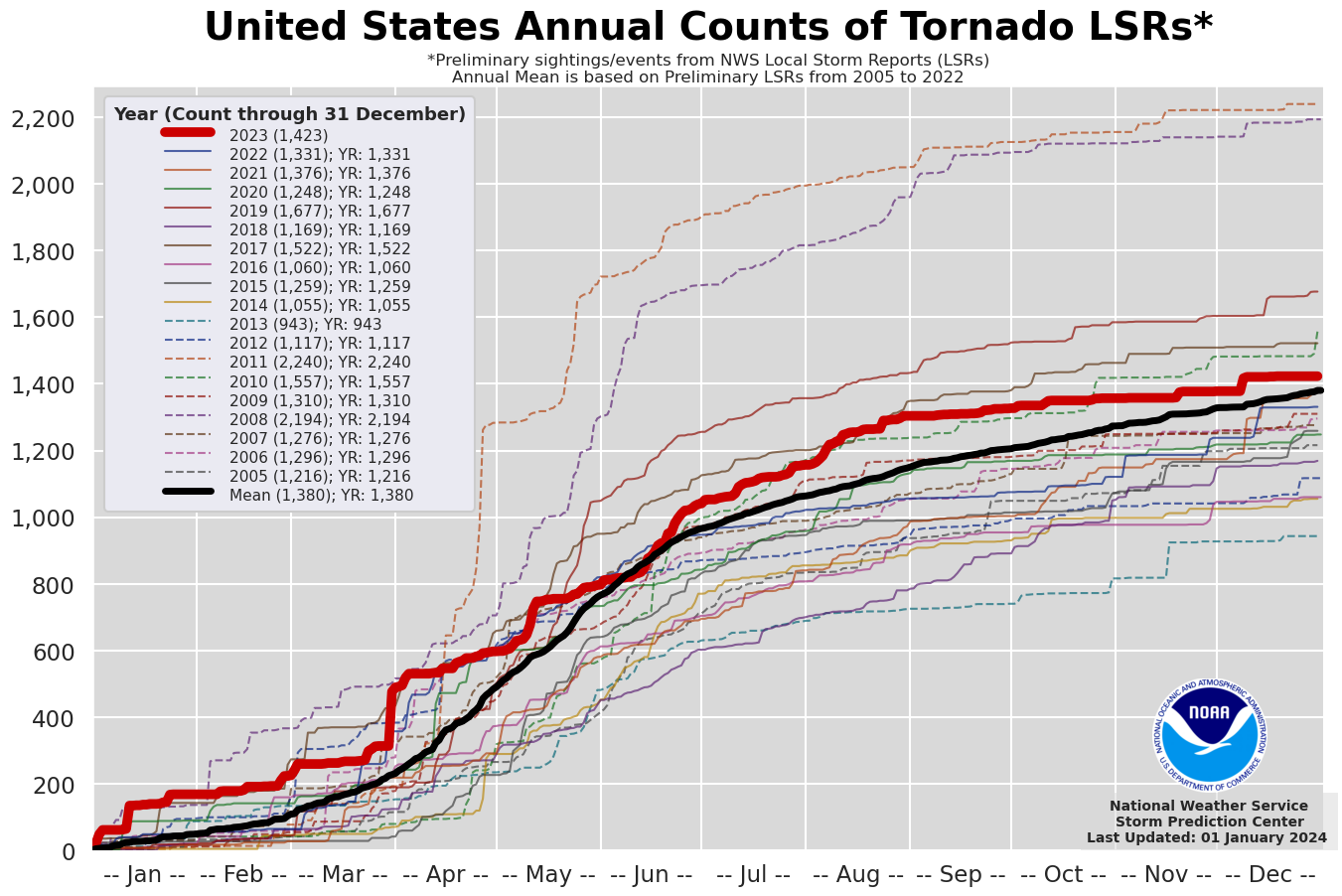
A chart of the 2023 United States tornado local storm report count compared to years 2005 through 2022, and the 2005–2022 mean

Fatal United States tornadoes in 2023
- Approximate touchdown location of killer tornadoes in 2023 Summary of tornadoes: January 12 – Alabama (7 deaths); January 12 – Georgia (1 death); February 26 – Oklahoma (1 death); March 24 – Mississippi (17 deaths); March 24 – Mississippi (3 deaths); March 24 – Mississippi (2 deaths); March 25 – Alabama (1 death); March 31 – Arkansas (4 deaths); March 31 – Tennessee (1 death); March 31 – Illinois (1 death); March 31 – Illinois, Indiana (6 deaths); March 31 – Indiana (2 deaths); March 31/April 1 – Tennessee (9 deaths); April 1 – Mississippi (1 death); April 1 – Alabama, Tennessee (1 death); April 1 – Delaware (1 death); April 5 – Missouri (5 deaths); April 19 – Oklahoma (1 death); May 13 – Texas (1 death); June 15 – Texas (3 deaths); June 18 – Mississippi (1 death); June 21 – Texas (4 deaths); June 25 – Indiana (1 death); August 24 – Michigan (2 deaths); December 9 – Tennessee, Kentucky (4 deaths); December 9 – Tennessee (3 deaths); Total fatalities: 83

== January ==
=== January 2–4 (United States) ===
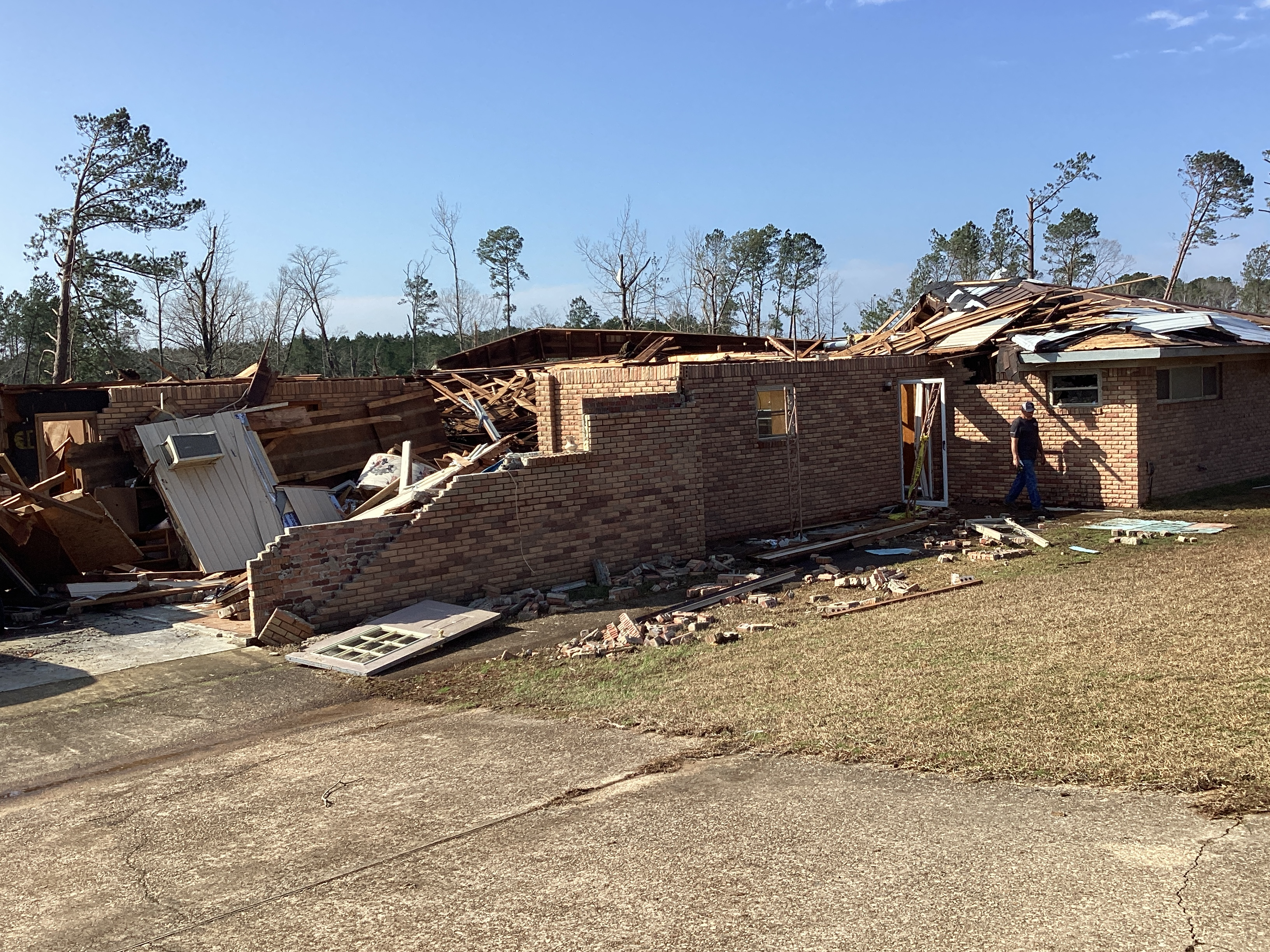
EF2 damage to a home northeast of Jonesboro, Louisiana.

EFU	EF0	EF1	EF2	EF3	EF4	EF5
5	25	24	4	0	0	0

In early January, a three-day severe-weather outbreak brought damaging winds, large hail, and a number of tornadoes to the Southern United States and impacted the Midwest to a lesser extent. On January 2, the Storm Prediction Center issued an enhanced risk for Arkansas and parts of surrounding states, with a 10% risk for tornadoes. An EF1 tornado damaged homes and the high school in Jessieville, Arkansas, injuring two people. A large 1.1-mile-wide (1.8 km) EF2 tornado caused severe damage near Jonesboro, Louisiana, snapping large trees, significantly damaging several residences, and injuring three people. Another strong EF2 tornado knocked down metal-truss electrical-transmission towers near Haile and destroyed an outbuilding. A third large, long-tracked EF2 tornado damaged or destroyed houses, vehicles, and a mobile home in Montrose, Arkansas, and snapped or uprooted many trees and power poles along its path. Another enhanced risk was issued the following day farther east in the Gulf Coast region, with 10% risk for tornadoes in parts of Louisiana, Mississippi, and Alabama. An EF2 tornado downed many large trees, tore most of the roof off a house, caused roof damage to other homes, and destroyed boathouses and outbuildings at the Jordan Lake Reservoir near Deatsville, Alabama. Several tornadoes touched down as far north as Illinois, including two EF0 and EF1 tornadoes that damaged outbuildings and farm equipment near Maroa. Another pair of EF1 and EF0 tornadoes briefly touched down in Decatur, with the EF1 tornado damaging a vacant bowling alley and the EF0 tornado causing minor damage at Richland Community College. Tornadoes continued touching down into the morning of January 4, including a high-end EF1 tornado that damaged several homes, flipped cars, and severely injured a person on the east side of Montgomery, Alabama. An EF1 tornado struck the small community of Roosterville, Georgia, destroying a barn and a mobile home. An EF1 tornado also struck Sandersville, where homes and a warehouse were damaged and many trees were downed, some of which landed on structures. A semi-truck was overturned in Sandersville, injuring the driver. Additional weak tornadoes touched down across parts of the Carolinas later that day before the outbreak ended. Fifty-eight tornadoes were confirmed.

Widespread flooding also occurred as a result of the storm system, with 8.55 in (217 mm) of rain in DeWitt, Arkansas, and 4.99 in (127 mm) in Greenville, Kentucky. Cane Creek State Park recorded 7.30 in (185 mm) of rain, its largest 24-hour total on record. Daily rainfall records were also set in Memphis, Tennessee, and Jackson, Mississippi, with Amtrak's northbound City of New Orleans delayed due to flooding and debris on the tracks between the cities. Further north, Minneapolis-St. Paul International Airport imposed a ground stop due to snow and ice in the region's fourth-largest January snowstorm. One fatality occurred due to the snowstorm as the result of a car crash in Clearwater Township, Minnesota. Snowfall totals reached as high as 27 in (69 cm) in parts of South Dakota.

=== January 12 (United States) ===
EFU	EF0	EF1	EF2	EF3	EF4	EF5
1	8	20	11	2	0	0

NEXRAD velocity imagery showing the paths of six tornadoes near Griffin, Georgia. The circulation in the red circle produced the main EF3 Griffin tornado, and the one in the pink produced the EF2 Jackson Lake tornado.

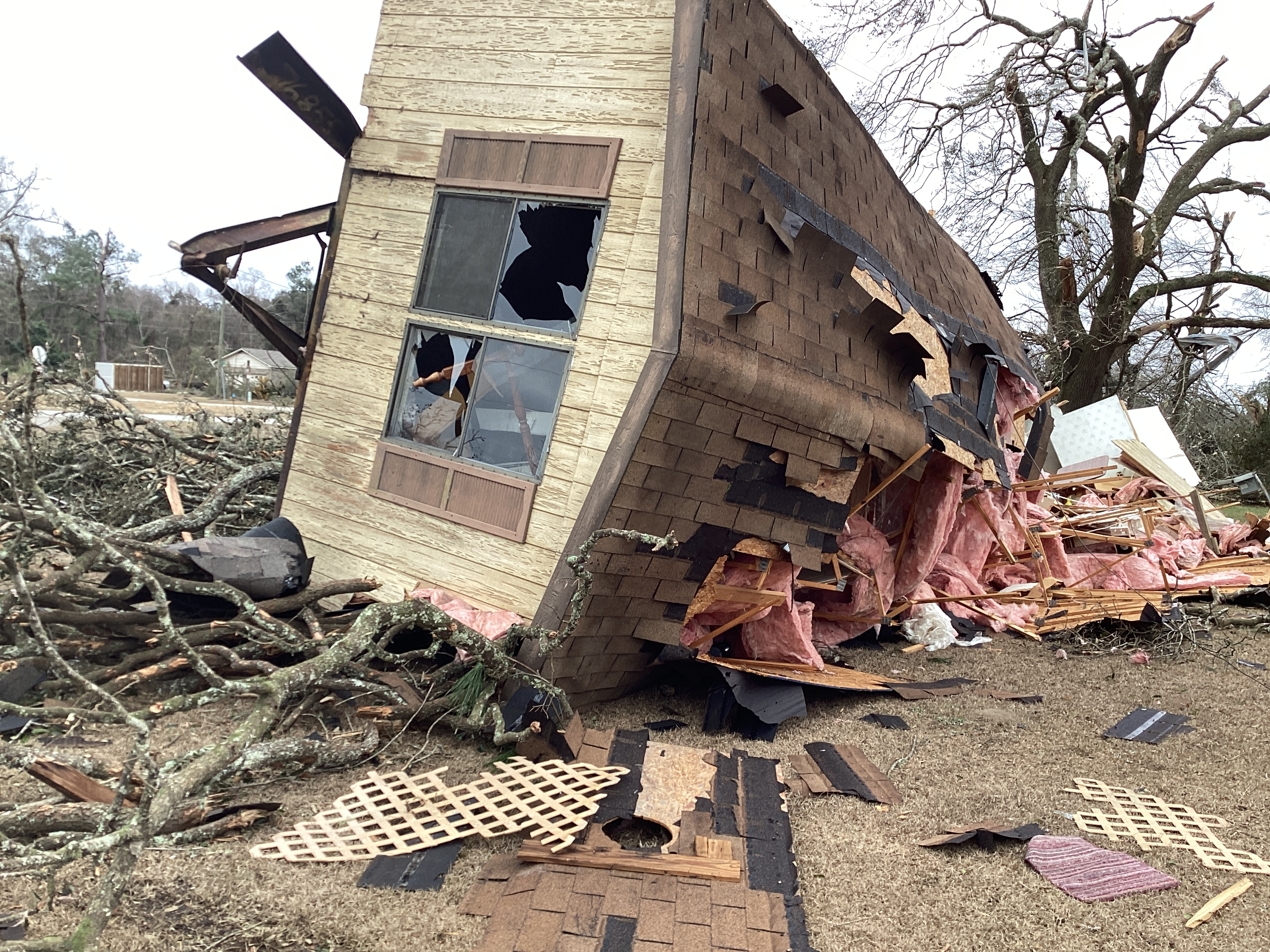
EF2 damage in Movico, Alabama.

A significant tornado outbreak impacted the southeastern United States, with several strong and long-tracked tornadoes touching down and causing a number of fatalities. The SPC issued an enhanced risk for severe weather on January 12, including a 10% risk area for tornadoes. Multiple supercell thunderstorms formed in the threat area later that day, and significant tornadoes began touching down. The small towns of Emelle, Eutaw, and Movico, Alabama, were impacted by EF2 tornadoes, with extensive damage. A large, high-end EF2 tornado caused severe structural damage in Selma, Alabama. Many homes and businesses sustained major damage in Selma, and a daycare with 70 children and workers was destroyed; only one minor injury occurred inside. The storm that produced the Selma tornado later produced a long-tracked EF3 tornado that prompted multiple tornado emergencies for Autauga, Elmore, Chilton, Coosa, and northern Tallapoosa counties. The tornado caused seven fatalities in the Old Kingston community of Autauga County as it obliterated mobile homes, tossed vehicles and caused massive timber damage. Strong tornadoes which were spawned by the Selma supercell also impacted parts of Georgia, including an EF2 tornado that inflicted major damage to homes and industrial buildings in LaGrange. A large EF3 tornado struck western Griffin and Experiment, severely damaging or destroying homes and businesses and flipping cars. This tornado was accompanied by three other tornadoes at the beginning of its track near Griffin, including a high-end EF2 tornado that caused severe damage to homes and trees. Another high-end EF2 tornado also caused significant damage in Jenkinsburg and near Jackson Lake, resulting in one fatality when a tree fell on a car, along with an indirect fatality the following day when a falling tree limb fell on a transportation worker who was working to restore power, knocking him out of his bucket truck. A high-end EF1 tornado touched down in the Atlanta suburb of Mableton, damaging an industrial business and downing many trees, some of which fell on homes. Other weak tornadoes were confirmed in parts of Mississippi, Tennessee, Kentucky, Illinois, and the Carolinas. The outbreak produced 42 tornadoes, killed eight people, and injured at least 53 others.

=== January 17 (Italy) ===
A brief but strong tornado struck Valmontone (a comune in the Metropolitan City of Rome Capital) on January 17, causing significant damage and injuring two people. The tornado was spawned by an embedded "comma head" circulation, and was captured by a surveillance camera. Multiple homes, apartment buildings, and other structures had severe roof damage, and the top floor of one residence was completely destroyed. Trees, gates, and fences were knocked down, and debris was strewn across yards and roads. The European Severe Storms Laboratory rated the tornado IF2 on the Fujita Scale, with a path length of 2.7 kilometres (1.7 mi) and a maximum width of 150 metres (160 yd). After the tornado, Valmontone declared a state of disaster.

=== January 24–25 (United States) ===
EFU	EF0	EF1	EF2	EF3	EF4	EF5
1	7	7	3	1	0	0

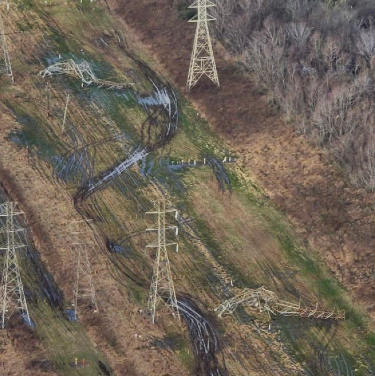
EF3 damage to metal-truss electrical-transmission towers in Deer Park, Texas.

A small but significant tornado outbreak impacted the southern United States throughout the day, primarily from Southeast Texas to southern Louisiana. The Storm Prediction Center issued an enhanced risk for much of the Gulf Coast region on January 24, including a 10% risk area for tornadoes. Multiple strong tornadoes were confirmed which included a large and destructive low-end EF3 tornado that moved through the southeastern sections of the Houston metropolitan area, impacting the suburbs of Pasadena and Deer Park. This prompted the issuance of a tornado emergency, the first ever issued by the National Weather Service forecast office in Houston. The intense, rain-wrapped tornado inflicted major structural damage to many homes, apartment buildings, churches and businesses, and downed many trees and power lines. Cars were thrown and mangled, a metal building was destroyed, a senior center sustained major damage, and metal-truss electrical-transmission towers were blown to the ground. There were no fatalities as a result of the EF3 Houston metro tornado, although a few minor injuries were reported. The tornado caused $6.6 million in damage. The storm also produced two EF0 tornadoes which caused minor damage in the Houston suburbs of Sienna and Pearland before spawning the EF3 tornado. Elsewhere, a brief EF2 tornado unroofed a house and destroyed a barn near Nome. Three people were injured by another EF2 tornado that touched down near Orangefield before striking the outskirts of Orange, causing major damage to mobile homes, houses, and outbuildings before crossing into Louisiana and inflicting additional severe damage to a number of structures north of Vinton. Several metal buildings were also damaged, and many large trees were snapped or uprooted by this tornado. In Louisiana, another EF2 tornado struck the small community of Gaytine, where houses had their roofs torn off, a mobile home was destroyed, a metal building was heavily damaged, and a fifth-wheel RV trailer was flipped. In Ventress, three people were injured by an EF1 tornado that destroyed a few mobile homes. Three weak tornadoes touched down in Florida on January 25 before the outbreak ended, and a total of 15 tornadoes were confirmed. The storms also produced flash flooding, and a one-day rainfall record of 4.05 in (103 mm) was set in Houston. Flash flooding temporarily closed SH 99.

== February ==
=== February 1 (Germany) ===
IFU	IF0	IF0.5	IF1	IF1.5	IF2	IF2.5	IF3	IF4	IF5
0	0	0	0	1	1	0	0	0	0

Severe thunderstorms formed in Germany on February 1, producing two tornadoes. The first was a short-lived IF1.5 tornado which tracked for 0.2 km (0.1 mi), damaging the roofs of 14 homes in Hinte. The second tornado struck areas near the small villages of Getmold, Lashorst and Hedem along a 5.3 km (3.3 mi)-long path, snapping or uprooting large trees and severely damaging the roofs of multiple homes. A car was damaged by a falling tree near Lashorst, a carriage house had its roof torn off, and a carport was damaged at a farmstead. The most significant damage was in a pine forest, where many large trees were completely mowed down or stripped of their limbs and several tree trunks were snapped off and thrown some distance into nearby fields. Based on tree damage, the second tornado was rated IF2. Over 85 severe-weather reports were documented in Europe that day, 69 in Germany.

=== February 16–17 (United States) ===
EFU	EF0	EF1	EF2	EF3	EF4	EF5
0	3	8	2	0	0	0

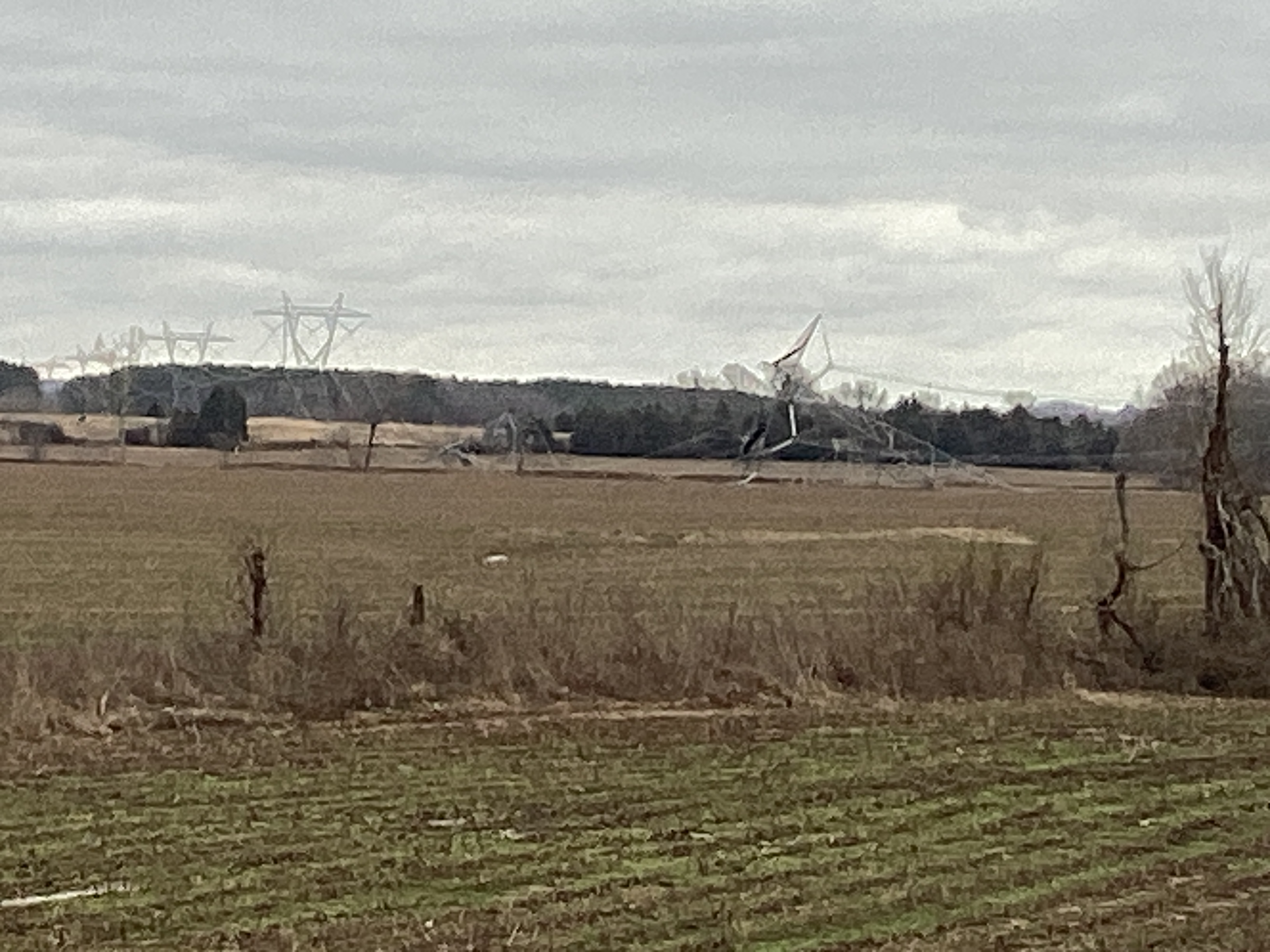
EF2 damage to electrical transmission towers west of Ripley, Mississippi.

The Storm Prediction Center issued an enhanced-risk for parts of the southeastern United States and the Ohio Valley on February 16, including a 10% risk area for tornadoes in parts of Mississippi, Alabama, and Tennessee. Severe thunderstorms developed later that day which produced damaging winds, large hail and several tornadoes, two of which were strong. An EF2 tornado near Pindall, Arkansas destroyed barns, pushed a house off its foundation, snapped trees, and injured two people. Another EF2 tornado injured one person, snapped many trees, and knocked over several metal-truss electrical-transmission towers near Ripley, Mississippi, before weakening and striking the north edge of town, where several homes and businesses had minor damage. An EF1 tornado near Wesson, Mississippi, rolled and destroyed a mobile home and damaged two other residences. An EF1 tornado near Ramer, Tennessee, inflicted heavy roof damage on a home and destroyed two garages, and another EF1 tornado near Lewisburg damaged homes, destroyed barns and outbuildings, and downed trees. An EF1 tornado caused considerable damage as it moved through southern LaGrange, Georgia on February 17, near where a damaging EF2 tornado had struck the previous month. Many trees were snapped or uprooted in LaGrange, and homes and businesses sustained roof and window damage. A total of 13 tornadoes were confirmed. In addition to tornadoes, straight-line winds from the system toppled a tree on the Northwestern University campus, injuring four people. Flooding caused by the storms killed two people: one in Kentucky and one in West Virginia. Flooding closed I-65 near Cullman, Alabama.

=== February 26–27 (United States) ===
EFU	EF0	EF1	EF2	EF3	EF4	EF5
4	13	12	3	0	0	0

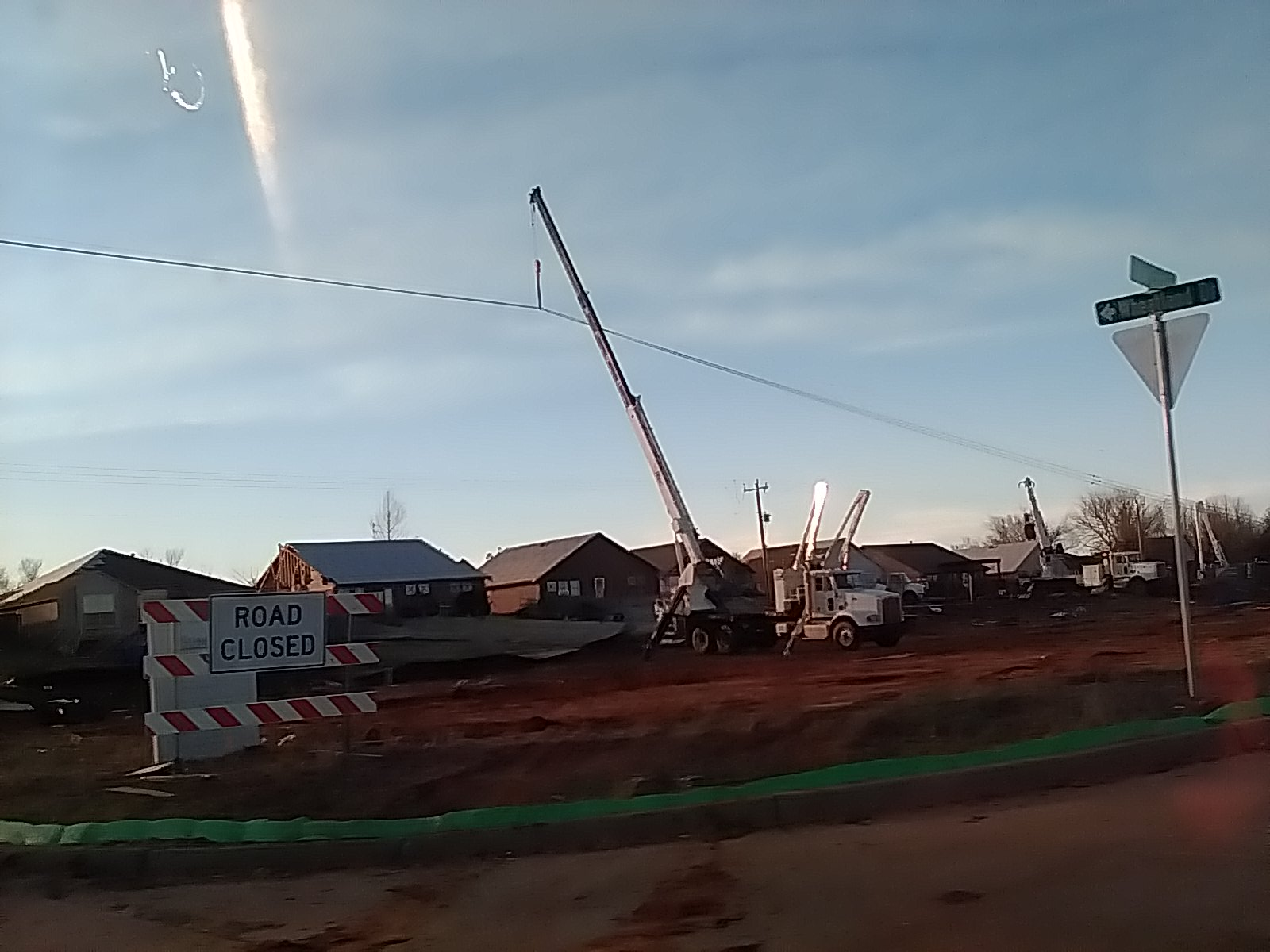
Damage to homes and power lines being repaired in Norman, Oklahoma after a high-end EF2 tornado struck the area.

A large storm system produced a wide range of significant weather events, ranging from heavy snow to tornadoes, across a large area of the United States on February 26. The Storm Prediction Center issued a moderate risk for west-central Oklahoma, with a 45% risk area for damaging winds. The outlook included a 10% risk area for tornadoes. An enhanced risk also extended from the Texas panhandle to southwestern Missouri. Aided by strong wind shear, a squall line of severe thunderstorms with damaging straight-line winds and multiple embedded tornadoes formed and moved through the risk area later that night. A high-end EF2 tornado destroyed manufactured homes, tossed vehicles, and killed one person as it moved through the outskirts of Cheyenne, Oklahoma, injuring three people. The line of storms produced five tornadoes that impacted areas in and around the Oklahoma City metropolitan area, two of which were strong. They included a high-end EF2 tornado that struck southeastern Norman, severely damaging homes and businesses, destroying self-storage units, overturning cars, and injuring 12 people. Another high-end EF2 tornado significantly damaged homes and other structures near Shawnee. Damaging straight-line winds of 70–80 mph (110–130 km/h) were widely reported, with locally higher gusts which included 114-mile-per-hour (183 km/h) in Memphis, Texas. Tornadic activity continued the next day in Illinois, Indiana, and Ohio as the system pushed east. Several weak tornadoes occurred, including a high-end EF1 tornado that touched down in Jacksonburg, Ohio, before it passed near Middletown, considerably damaging several homes, barns, and trees. 32 tornadoes were confirmed, with one tornado-related fatality; Oklahoma's 12 tornadoes set a February state record. Twelve non-tornado-related fatalities occurred as a result of the storm system.

== March ==
=== March 1–3 (United States) ===
EFU	EF0	EF1	EF2	EF3	EF4	EF5
0	11	22	2	0	0	0

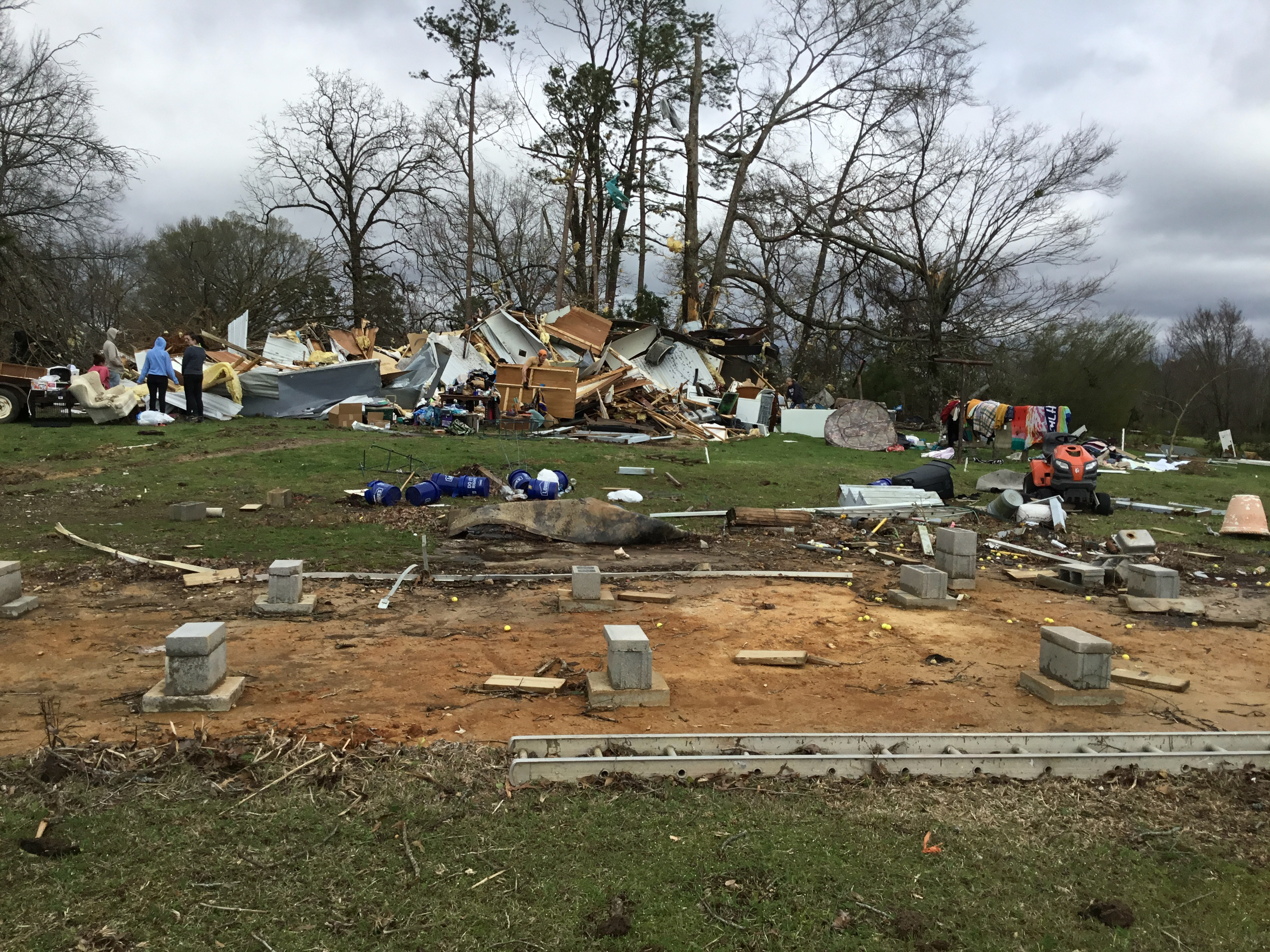
A mobile home destroyed by a high-end EF2 tornado near Kirby, Arkansas.

A storm system brought widespread severe weather, including multiple tornadoes, across a large portion of the eastern United States in early March. The Storm Prediction Center outlined an enhanced risk across areas of Texas, Oklahoma, Arkansas, Mississippi, and Tennessee on March 1, including a 10-percent-risk area for tornadoes. A low-end EF1 tornado caused minor damage to a church in Shottsville, Alabama before downing trees and damaging the roof of a house along its path. A stronger, short-lived, high-end EF1 tornado touched down in a subdivision near Hazel Green, Alabama, severely damaging several homes and overturning a vehicle. On March 2, the SPC issued a moderate risk for the following day for parts of Texas, Arkansas, and Louisiana. A 15-percent-risk risk of tornadoes was in place across the Ark-La-Tex region, with the possibility of strong tornadoes; this was downgraded to a 10-percent risk due to uncertainty about convective modes that day. A 45-percent risk of wind damage was also in place in the same general area. A high-end EF2 tornado demolished two chicken houses and a mobile home, snapped many trees and power poles, partially unroofed a house, and injured five people near Kirby, Arkansas. Several other weak tornadoes touched down throughout the threat area, including an EF1 tornado that damaged a number of homes and several businesses as it moved through southeastern Shreveport, Louisiana, injuring two people. A high-end EF1 tornado damaged multiple buildings in Pickton, Texas as well. The storm system moved into the Ohio Valley on March 3, where an EF2 tornado in the small community of Fremont, Kentucky destroyed outbuildings, heavily damaged a church, and tore the roofs off several homes. In Vanderburgh County, Indiana, an EF1 tornado unroofed a church and damaged many homes and trees in Saint Joseph. Another EF1 tornado tracked from Duff to northwest Jasper, downing many trees, damaging or destroying several barns, and damaging residential roofs and siding. In Highland County, Ohio, an EF1 tornado severely damaged homes and outbuildings in and around Pricetown, downed numerous trees and tree limbs, and tore much of the roof off a church along its path. Farther south, two EF1 tornadoes in Alabama caused minor to moderate damage in and around Section and Rosalie. An EF1 tornado downed many trees in and around Gray Court, South Carolina, some of which fell on houses. In addition to the tornadoes, the severe thunderstorms produced damaging straight-line winds and flooding. Thirty-three tornadoes were confirmed, and at least 13 non-tornado-related deaths occurred as a result of the storm system.

=== March 9 (France) ===
A strong tornado was caught on video from multiple angles as it impacted areas in and around several small towns and villages in the Nouvelle-Aquitaine region of France on March 9, causing extensive damage. The tornado first badly damaged the roof of a school in Masbaraud-Mérignat before it moved to the northeast and struck Pontarion, where multiple homes and other structures had their roofs severely damaged and one house was unroofed. Vehicles were damaged by flying debris, trees and power poles were downed, a large masonry storage building was partially destroyed, and roof tiles and other projectiles were driven into the exterior walls of residential buildings. The tornado also caused significant tree damage as it moved through wooded areas outside Pontarion, snapping and uprooting many large trees and damaging or destroying multiple outbuildings. Near the end of the path, 17 homes sustained minor damage in the Le Donzeil area before the tornado dissipated. It was rated IF2 by the ESSL (European Severe Storms Laboratory), and EF2 by the French Observatory of Tornadoes and Violent Thunderstorms (Keraunos). Keraunos noted that the environment where the tornado formed was conducive for tornado development, since high instability and shear were present in France that day.

=== March 13 (Saudi Arabia) ===
A large, dusty tornado caused significant damage as it touched down near the outskirts of Taif, Saudi Arabia, on March 13. Several buildings sustained major damage, including loss of roofs and exterior walls. Power poles and iron fence posts were knocked over, and cars and trucks were thrown and severely damaged. A man was killed by flying debris, and at least one person was severely injured.

=== March 22 (California) ===
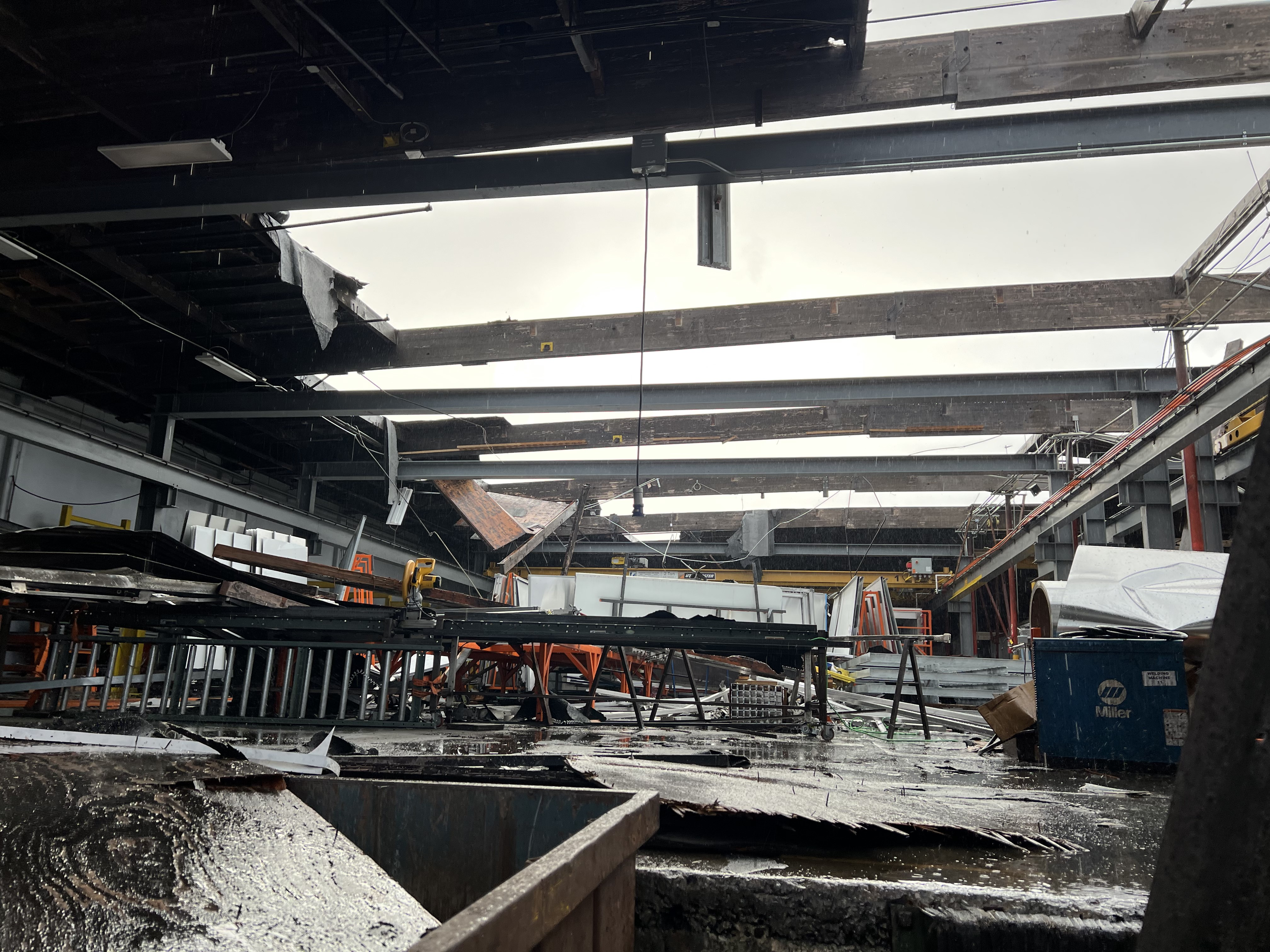
EF1 damage to a warehouse in Montebello, California.

On the morning of March 22, a high-end EF1 tornado struck the Los Angeles suburb of Montebello and caused considerable damage. The tornado moved through an industrial area, where multiple warehouses had large sections of their roofs torn off. One warehouse roof almost totally collapsed, and its HVAC unit was ripped off. Signs were damaged or destroyed, windows were shattered, and a number of vehicles were damaged by flying debris. A power pole and trees were downed, a semi-trailer was tipped over, and debris was scattered throughout the area. One person was injured. It was the strongest tornado to hit Greater Los Angeles since 1983. The storm set a daily Los Angeles rain record of 1.01 in (26 mm).

=== March 24 (India) ===
A large cone tornado struck Fazilka in India on March 24, causing significant damage. At least 50 unreinforced masonry homes were severely damaged or destroyed. Farming equipment was tossed, trees were snapped or uprooted, power poles were downed, and there was significant crop damage in farm fields. At least 12 people were injured.

=== March 24–27 (United States) ===
EFU	EF0	EF1	EF2	EF3	EF4	EF5
0	4	21	6	3	1	0

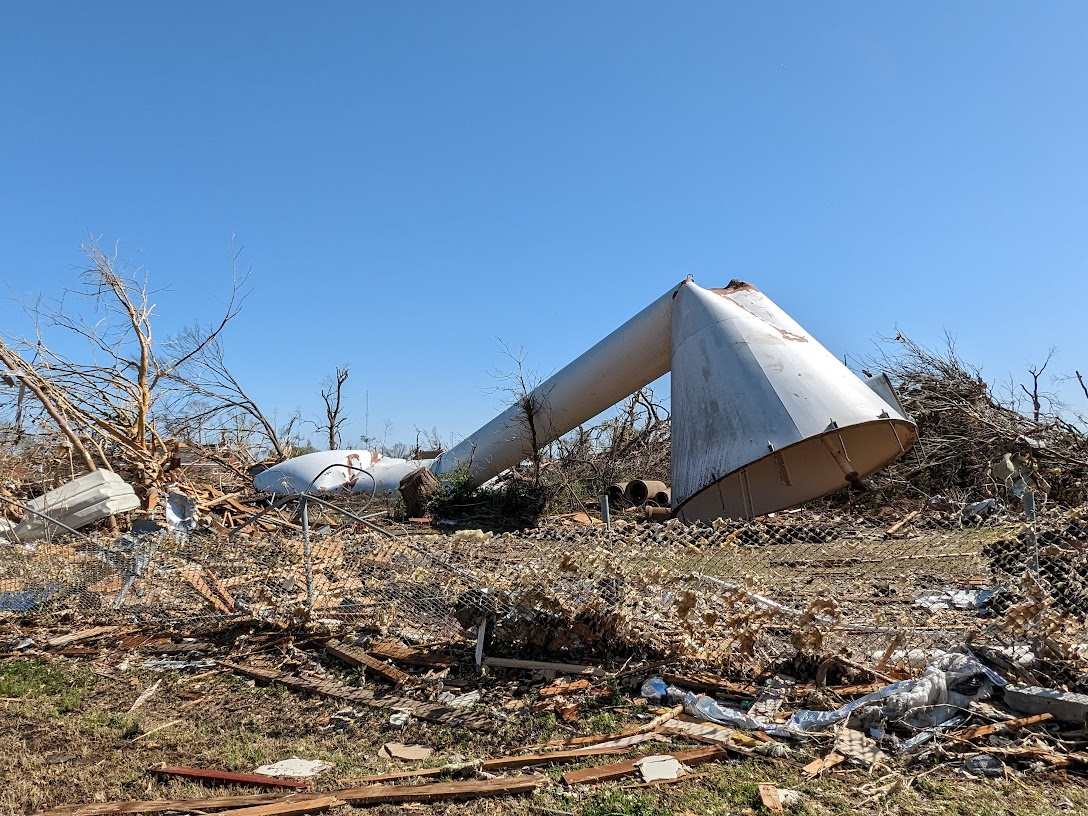
EF4 damage to the Rolling Fork, Mississippi, water tower.

A four-day severe weather and tornado outbreak began on March 24 in the southeastern United States. It began in the morning, with two EF1 tornadoes causing injuries in Texas before more significant tornadoes impacted Mississippi that night. One long-tracked, violent high-end EF4 tornado with estimatined wind speeds up to 195 mph (314 km/h) prompted a tornado emergency for Rolling Fork and Silver City, killing 17 people. Both communities had major damage, with widespread catastrophic damage throughout much of Rolling Fork. Another intense EF3 tornado from the same storm prompted a tornado emergency as it struck Winona, killing three people and causing significant damage along its path. Another destructive EF3 tornado from the same storm caused major damage near or in Egypt, New Wren, and Amory, resulting two fatalities. More tornadoes touched down in Alabama and Tennessee later that night and into the early morning of March 25, including an EF2 tornado that caused damage in Fayetteville, Tennessee, and another EF2 tornado that killed one person in Hartselle, Alabama early on March 25. From March 26 into March 27, the slow-moving storm system stalled. More severe weather occurred over the next two days with several additional tornadoes, including an EF3 tornado north of West Point, Georgia on March 26, which badly damaged or destroyed numerous homes, caused major tree damage, and injured five people. Thirty-three tornadoes were confirmed from the outbreak, which killed 23 people and injured many others.

=== March 31 – April 1 (United States) ===
EFU	EF0	EF1	EF2	EF3	EF4	EF5
9	45	47	32	11	1	0

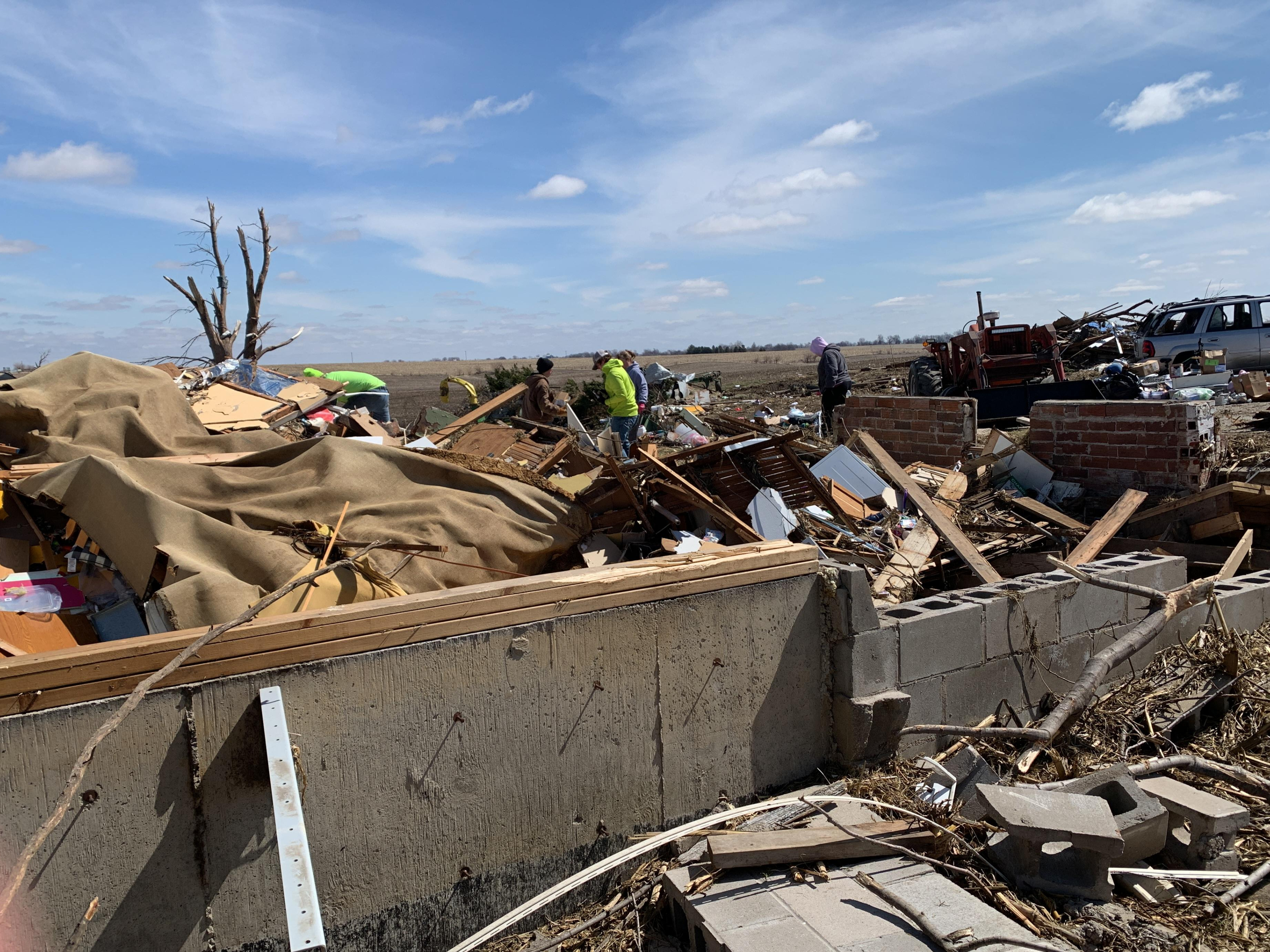
Low-end EF4 damage to a farmhouse north of Keota, Iowa.

A very large, historic, deadly tornado outbreak impacted large portions of the midwestern, southern, and eastern United States. A tornado-driven high risk was issued for two areas in the Mississippi Valley on the morning of March 31, the first high-risk issuance since March 25, 2021. The first high risk area covered southeastern Iowa, northwestern Illinois, and far northeastern Missouri, while the second included eastern Arkansas, southwestern Tennessee, and northern Mississippi. That afternoon in the area around the southern high-risk area, a long-tracked high-end EF3 wedge tornado passed through the Little Rock, Arkansas metro area, prompting a tornado emergency as it significantly damaged or destroyed hundreds of homes, apartments, businesses, and other structures, caused an indirect fatality, and injured 54 people. Several other large, long-tracked tornadoes touched down that afternoon and evening, including an EF3 tornado that killed four people in Wynne, Arkansas, and another EF3 tornado that killed a person in Covington, Tennessee, both of which were prompted tornado emergencies. Further to the north in the northern high-risk area, an intense, high-end EF3 tornado later caused severe damage near Martinsburg, Iowa, and the same storm produced a violent, low-end EF4 tornado that destroyed multiple homes near Keota. The Iowa towns of Coralville, Hills, Mediapolis, and Charlotte, as well as Sherman and Geneseo, Illinois, were impacted by EF2 tornadoes. An EF1 tornado that struck Belvidere collapsed the roof of the Apollo Theatre, which was hosting a sold-out concert, causing the roof to collapse. One person was killed inside the theatre, and over 40 others were injured.

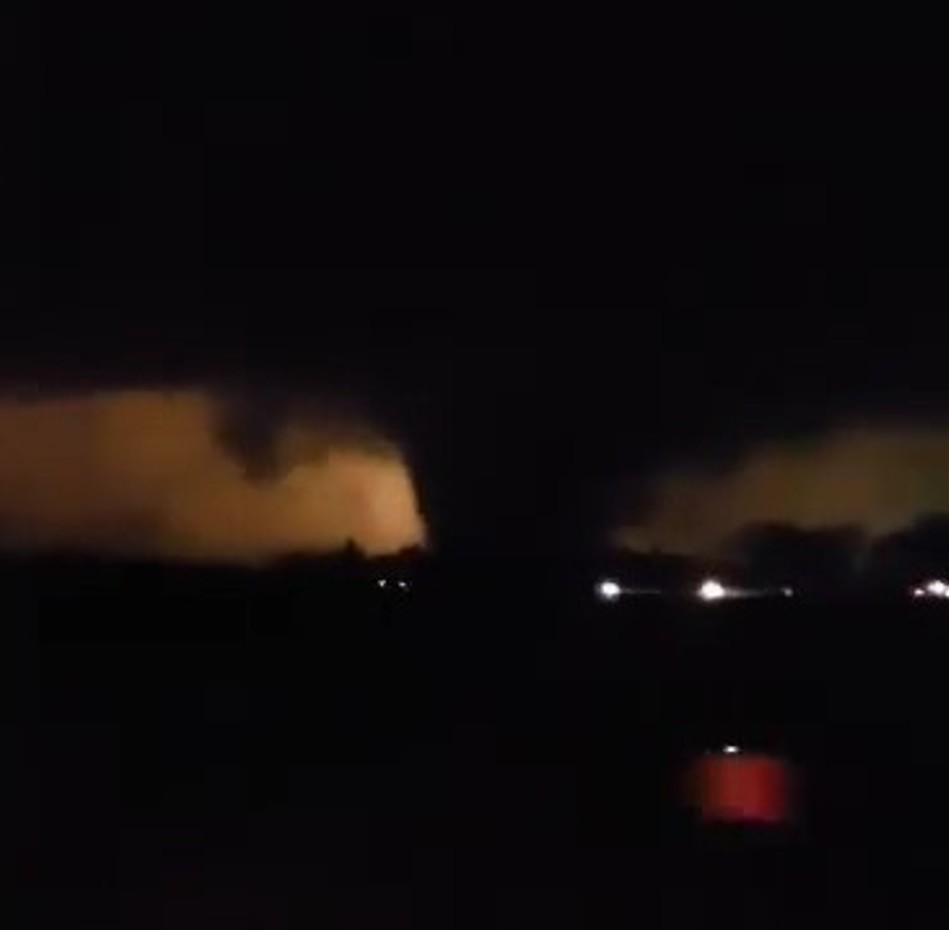
A large, nocturnal EF3 tornado in Robinson, Illinois on March 31.

Between the two high-risk areas in the much larger moderate risk, another tornado-emergency-prompting, destructive EF3 tornado killed six people in and around Robinson, Illinois and Sullivan, Indiana. The same cell continued northeastward, producing another EF3 tornado that destroyed homes, tossed cars and farm machinery, and killed two people near Spencer. It later spawned yet another EF3 tornado which struck Whiteland, destroying a warehouse and many homes. That night, another destructive, long-tracked EF3 tornado killed nine people in McNairy County, Tennessee, impacting the outskirts of Bethel Springs and Adamsville. Very early the next morning on April 1, a high-end EF3 tornado north of Hazel Green, Alabama, destroyed homes and killed one person.

More severe weather occurred later that day along the eastern Great Lakes and East Coast, producing widespread damaging winds, isolated hail, and tornadoes; this included a rare and destructive low-end EF3 tornado that killed one person in Sussex County, Delaware. The tornado was the largest ever recorded in Delaware as well as the second killer tornado and the second tornado rated F3 or EF3 in the state since reliable records began in 1950. Seven tornadoes also touched down in New Jersey, three of which were EF2. In all, the outbreak produced 145 tornadoes, killed 26 people (plus one more person indirectly), and injured at least 218 others. Six non-tornadic deaths also occurred during the outbreak.

== April ==
=== April 4–5 (United States) ===
EFU	EF0	EF1	EF2	EF3	EF4	EF5
3	9	13	3	1	0	0

Another severe weather and tornado outbreak affected the Midwest, the Mississippi Valley, and the Great Lakes in early April. A moderate risk was issued by the SPC for parts of Illinois and Iowa on April 4, with another moderate risk for parts of Arkansas and Missouri. A 15% risk area for tornadoes was in place for both moderate risk areas. Multiple tornadoes touched down during the afternoon and evening, including two EF1 tornadoes that touched down in the Quad Cities metro area, downing trees and damaging the roofs of homes in Rock Island and Moline, Illinois. Near Pleasantville, Iowa, a narrow high-end EF1 tornado which damaged homes and outbuildings was caught on video by many storm chasers. The outbreak's most intense tornado was a large, high-end EF3 which destroyed homes and injured four people near Lewistown, Illinois, before causing significant damage in Bryant. Multiple storm chasers were directly impacted by the tornado and had their vehicles rolled, though they were not injured. A brief EF2 tornado ripped the roof off a gas station in Colona, and another EF2 tornado destroyed outbuildings and uplifted the roof of a house near Geneseo. A high-end EF1 tornado also struck Table Grove and damaged homes, garages, and trees. A high-end EF2 tornado moved through Grassy and Glen Allen, Missouri during the early-morning hours of April 5, causing severe damage. Multiple homes had their roofs torn off, and some sustained loss of exterior walls. Outbuildings and mobile homes were also completely destroyed by the tornado, with five people killed in one of the mobile homes. This was the deadliest tornado in Missouri since the 2011 Joplin tornado.

Weak tornadoes continued to touch down across parts of the Ohio Valley later that day, including three EF1 tornadoes that caused considerable damage in the Louisville metro area. One reached high-end EF1 strength, and unroofed an apartment building in the Pleasure Ridge Park neighborhood. The other two tornadoes damaged warehouses and businesses in the suburb of Watterson Park, one of which damaged the Yum! Brands headquarters. A non-tornadic fatality occurred in Louisville when a man walking his dog was killed by a falling tree. Farther east, an EF0 tornado caused minor damage in Pleasantville, Ohio. The Cincinnati Reds-Chicago Cubs baseball game was postponed by the storms, and Chicago O'Hare International Airport had a ground stop. Anticipated severe weather in the Eastern United States on April 6 resulted in the New York Mets, Baltimore Orioles, and Philadelphia Phillies postponing their home opening games. Five tornado-related fatalities and 27 tornadoes were confirmed, in addition to the non-tornadic fatality. The National Centers for Environmental Information reported that the storm system caused $2.2 billion (2023 USD) in damage.

=== April 10 (Europe) ===
IFU	IF0	IF0.5	IF1	IF1.5	IF2	IF2.5	IF3	IF4	IF5
1	0	0	0	1	1	0	0	0	0

On April 10, several tornadoes occurred in the Mediterranean region. The most significant tornado touched down in the Ağaçören District of Aksaray Province in the Central Anatolia Region of Turkey. It tracked through or near the villages of Camili, Avşar, Kırımini and Göllü along a 22 km (14 mi) path, with a maximum width of 200 m (220 yd). The tornado, which was rated IF2, destroyed the roofs of homes, partially collapsed walls, and killed farm animals. Masonry outbuildings were destroyed, a tractor-trailer was overturned, and trees and power-line pylons were downed as well. The minaret of the Göllü mosque collapsed, injuring a 26-year-old man. An IF1.5 tornado struck areas in and around Budak, where another minaret collapsed, outbuildings were destroyed on dairy farms, and homes had roof damage. A waterspout came ashore near Pizzo in Southern Italy, causing no damage.

=== April 15 (China) ===
EFU	EF0	EF1	EF2	EF3	EF4	EF5
0	0	1	1	0	0	0

On April 15, a significant EF2 tornado struck areas near the large city of Linyi in Shandong Province, with significant damage in the Tancheng County village of Lizhuangzhen. The tornado was captured on video from multiple angles, some from close range. Homes and other structures were severely damaged, including several that lost their roofs and exterior walls. Metal truss transmission towers, power poles, and masonry fences were toppled over, and outbuildings were destroyed. Tractors and cars were tossed as well, trees were snapped, and several people were injured. Another tornado was reported in Dezhou, Shandong Province and was officially rated EF1.

=== April 15 (United States) ===
EFU	EF0	EF1	EF2	EF3	EF4	EF5
3	4	6	1	0	0	0

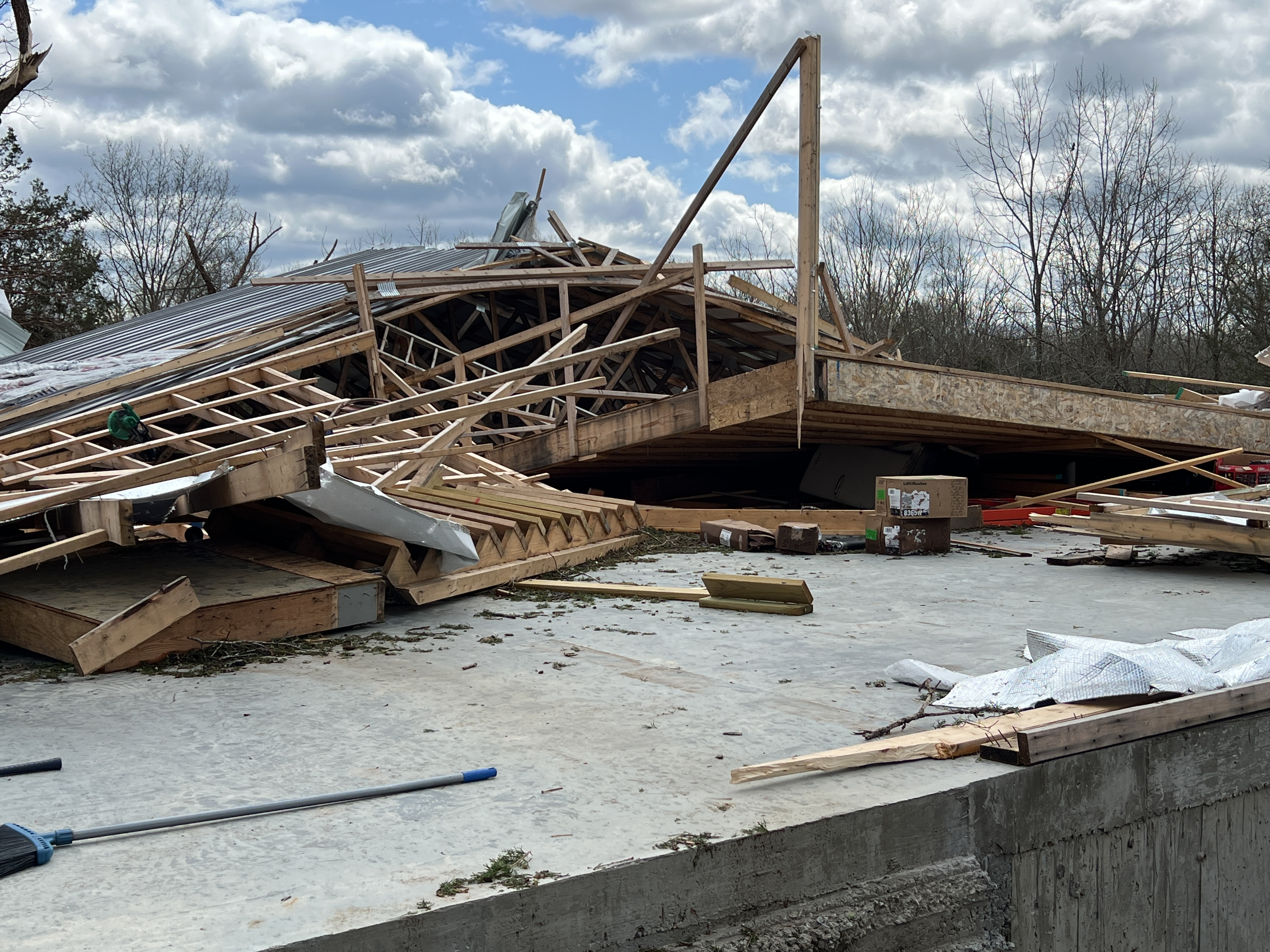
EF2 damage to a structure west of Vichy, Missouri.

A linear complex of severe thunderstorms with embedded circulations developed in Missouri and moved eastward through the St. Louis metro area on April 15, producing multiple tornadoes. A strong EF2 tornado inflicted major structural damage to a house near Vichy, Missouri, damaged or destroyed multiple outbuildings, heavily damaged metal airplane hangars at Rolla National Airport, and injured five people. An EF1 tornado moved through the St. Louis suburbs of Fenton and Sunset Hills, damaging homes, warehouses, and trees. The towns of Hillsboro, Festus, and Pevely were also hit by EF1 tornadoes, resulting in minor to moderate damage. Another EF1 tornado struck Belleville, Illinois, where homes, apartment buildings, and businesses had roofing blown off and trees were snapped or uprooted, some of which fell on structures. Farther south, an isolated EF1 tornado damaged trees and homes near Ringgold, Louisiana. Fourteen tornadoes were confirmed, and numerous reports of damaging straight-line winds were received. The National Centers for Environmental Information documented that this storm system caused $1.1 billion (2023 USD) in damage. The line of storms forced the Kansas City Royals to postpone their baseball game against the Atlanta Braves.

=== April 19–20 (United States) ===
EFU	EF0	EF1	EF2	EF3	EF4	EF5
4	11	12	6	2	0	0

On April 19, a tornado outbreak impacted areas in the southern Great Plains. In Oklahoma, 18 tornadoes touched down and moved erratically near the southern and eastern outskirts of the Oklahoma City metropolitan area. Several were strong, and most were produced by a large, slow-moving supercell that moved east-northeast. A large, high-end EF3 tornado struck Cole, heavily damaging or destroying homes, mobile homes, and other structures and killing one person. An indirect fatality from the tornado was also confirmed due to one of the two people injured by the tornado dying of a heart attack on the way to the hospital. The supercell produced multiple weak tornadoes and two large, high-end EF2 tornadoes that caused significant damage near Etowah, before merging with another tornadic supercell to its west. This cluster of storms spawned a large, broad mesocyclone with several circulations rotating around each other due to the Fujiwhara effect. These circulations produced multiple strong tornadoes after sunset that moved along erratic paths. They included EF3 and EF2 tornadoes south and north of Pink, respectively, and a large high-end EF2 tornado that struck Shawnee. Numerous homes and other buildings were severely damaged or destroyed in Shawnee, including buildings at Oklahoma Baptist University and Shawnee High School. A news-gathering Bell 206 B3 JetRanger helicopter operated by Tulsa television station KOTV was damaged at the Shawnee Regional Airport, along with several hangars.

A supercell produced a series of eight tornadoes in Chase County, Kansas, near Strong City, including an EF0 tornado that overturned a semi-truck near Elmdale and injured one person. Two EF2 tornadoes near Strong City severely damaged outbuildings, silos, power poles and trees, and an EF0 tornado caused minor tree damage in Strong City. An EF1 tornado caused minor to moderate damage as it moved through Cottonwood Falls, and an EF0 tornado injured a person in a vehicle near Saffordville. Three EFU (unknown-intensity) tornadoes were confirmed in Iowa. Another round of severe weather occurred the next day from southern Wisconsin to South Texas, including three weak tornadoes in Illinois and Texas and hail in Illinois up to 3 inches (7.6 cm) in diameter. Federal disaster assistance was requested in Oklahoma after the tornado outbreak, and 32 tornadoes were confirmed. There was one direct tornado-related fatality, along with an indirect fatality and 188 injuries. The outbreak caused $1.9 billion in damage.

=== April 20 (Turkey) ===
IFU	IF0	IF0.5	IF1	IF1.5	IF2	IF2.5	IF3	IF4	IF5
0	0	0	0	2	0	0	0	0	0

Two tornadoes caused damage in Turkey on April 20. The first struck the outskirts of Pazarcık, Kahramanmaraş, where roofing was torn from buildings, cars and storage containers were flipped, and trees were downed. The tornado also struck a camp housing survivors of the 2023 Turkey–Syria earthquakes, where tents were torn apart and struck by flying debris. Three people were killed at the camp, and 150 were injured. The tornado was rated IF1.5 on the Fujita scale by the European Severe Storms Laboratory. A second IF1.5 tornado struck the village of Tatlıçayır, Diyarbakır Province, where homes had roof damage, a frail masonry outbuilding was destroyed, trees were downed, and farm animals were injured.

=== April 21 (Myanmar) ===
At about 6:10 p.m. on April 21, a strong and deadly tornado Myanmar in Leiway Township near the capital city of Naypyidaw, causing major damage and killing several people in the villages of Tada Oo and Aung Myin Kone. A total 230 houses were destroyed, and many trees and power lines were downed. A small clinic, a school, and two Buddhist monasteries were also destroyed. Eight people were killed and 128 were hospitalized. The tornado was never officially rated.

=== April 22–23 (Oman) ===
On April 22, a tornado was caught on video by local residents as it struck Jalan Bani Bu Ali in Ash Sharqiyah South Governorate of eastern Oman. The tornado damaged many homes, killed farm animals, and injured a woman. The storm system that spawned the tornado also caused torrential rainfall and flash flooding. Jalan Bani Bu Ali was hit by another tornado the following day.

=== April 27–30 (United States) ===
EFU	EF0	EF1	EF2	EF3	EF4	EF5
1	6	6	2	1	0	0

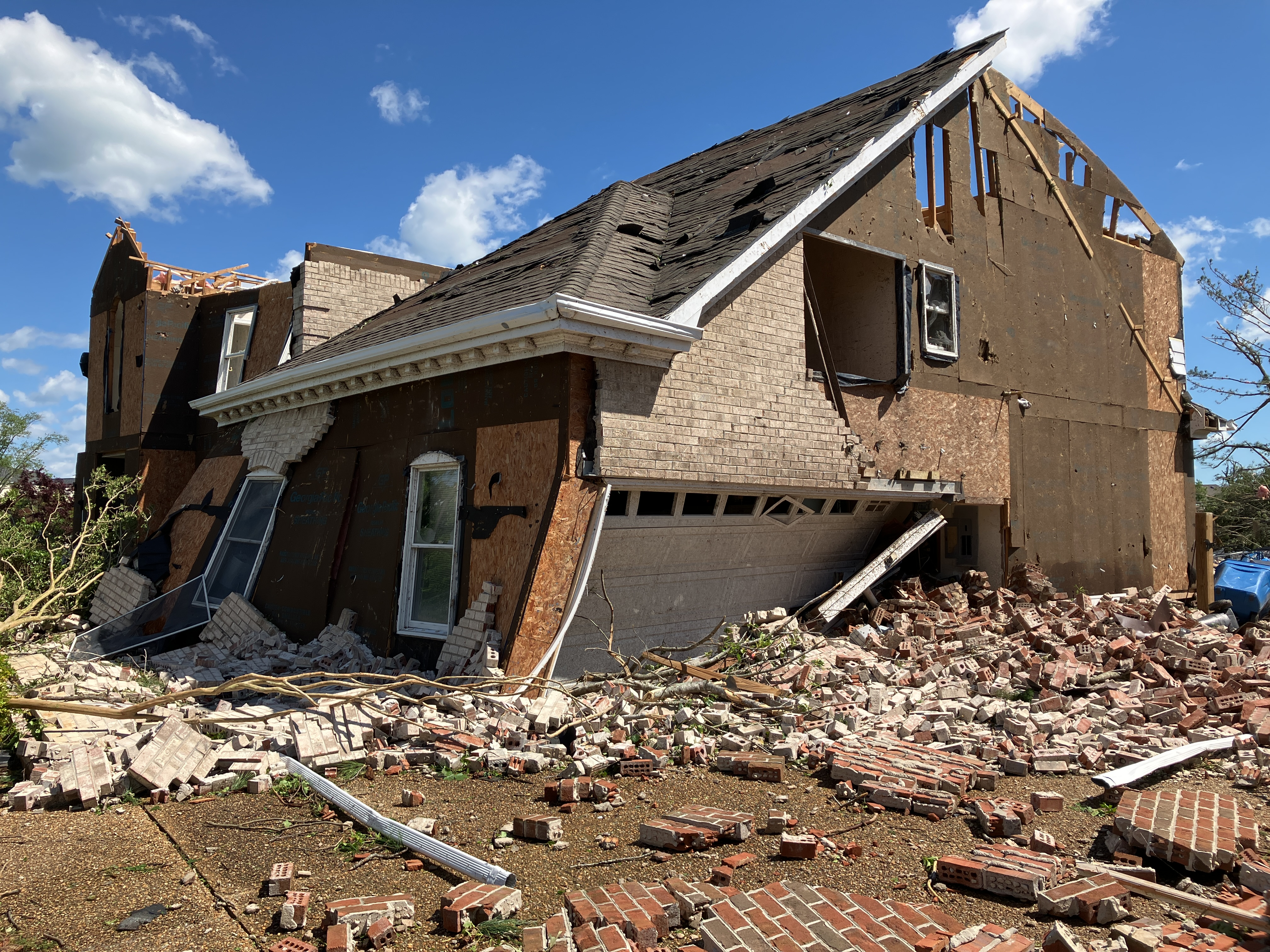
Low-end EF3 damage to a home in Virginia Beach, Virginia.

In late April, a slow-moving weather system produced scattered tornadoes in the Southern United States and Eastern United States over a four-day period. On April 27, the Storm Prediction Center issued a slight risk for the Gulf Coast, including a 5% risk of tornadoes. A strong EF2 tornado struck the small town of Hosford, Florida, downing many trees and severely damaging several homes. A high-end EF1 tornado caused damage in Lynn Haven, and several other weak tornadoes touched down in other parts of Florida and Georgia. On April 28, an EF0 tornado caused minor damage in Boynton Beach, a brief EF0 tornado also caused minor damage near Elkin, North Carolina, and an EF1 tornado downed many trees and injured two people at Fort Hood (now Fort Cavazos) in Texas. The SPC issued a slight risk for most of Florida and southeast Georgia the following day, including a 5% risk area for tornadoes. An MCS off the Florida coast produced damaging straight-line winds and heavy rain throughout the day. In Palm Beach Gardens, Florida, a high-end EF2 tornado partially unroofed an apartment building, largely destroyed a manufactured home, heavily damaged a dry-cleaning business, and downed many trees and large metal light poles. Along US 1, the tornado was caught on video as it flipped and tossed cars. During the early morning of April 30, a high-end EF1 tornado destroyed a metal storage building in rural Charlotte County, Florida. That afternoon, clusters of severe storms affected South Carolina, eastern North Carolina and the Hampton Roads area of Virginia. One embedded supercell made its way into north Virginia Beach, Virginia and produced an intense EF3 tornado that struck the city's residential areas, snapping or uprooting trees, overturning vehicles, and causing significant structural damage. Multiple large, well-built homes had their roofs torn off and sustained collapse of their top-floor exterior walls. The tornado then struck Fort Story, causing less severe damage there before it moved out into the Atlantic Ocean. Numerous videos and photographs taken by Virginia Beach residents depicted a "stovepipe" tornado with an audible roar. In addition to tornadoes, flash flooding affected the East Coast on April 30. In all, 16 tornadoes were confirmed.

=== April 28 (Indonesia) ===
A significant tornado struck four small Indonesian villages in the Kodi District of Southwest Sumba at 2:30 pm Central Indonesian Time (6:30 am UTC) on April 28. It damaged or destroyed 21 homes and killed nine people.

== May ==
=== May 6 (Europe) ===
IFU	IF0	IF0.5	IF1	IF1.5	IF2	IF2.5	IF3	IF4	IF5
0	0	0	1	0	1	0	0	0	0

An IF2 tornado caused damage in the Sultan Alaaddin, Akarca and Ören districts as it moved through the city of Anamur, Turkey on May 6. Homes and apartment buildings sustained damage to their roofs, windows, and balconies, and some businesses were also damaged. Vehicles were flipped and tossed, and trees and power lines were downed as well. Around 100 large commercial greenhouses were damaged or destroyed in Anamur, and 13 people were injured. In Austria, an IF1 tornado struck the town of Ziersdorf and damaged outbuildings and the roofs of several homes. A section of roofing from one home was torn off and thrown 50 meters, two cars were damaged by flying debris, and trees and telephone lines were damaged.

=== May 6–7 (United States) ===
EFU	EF0	EF1	EF2	EF3	EF4	EF5
10	8	7	1	0	0	0

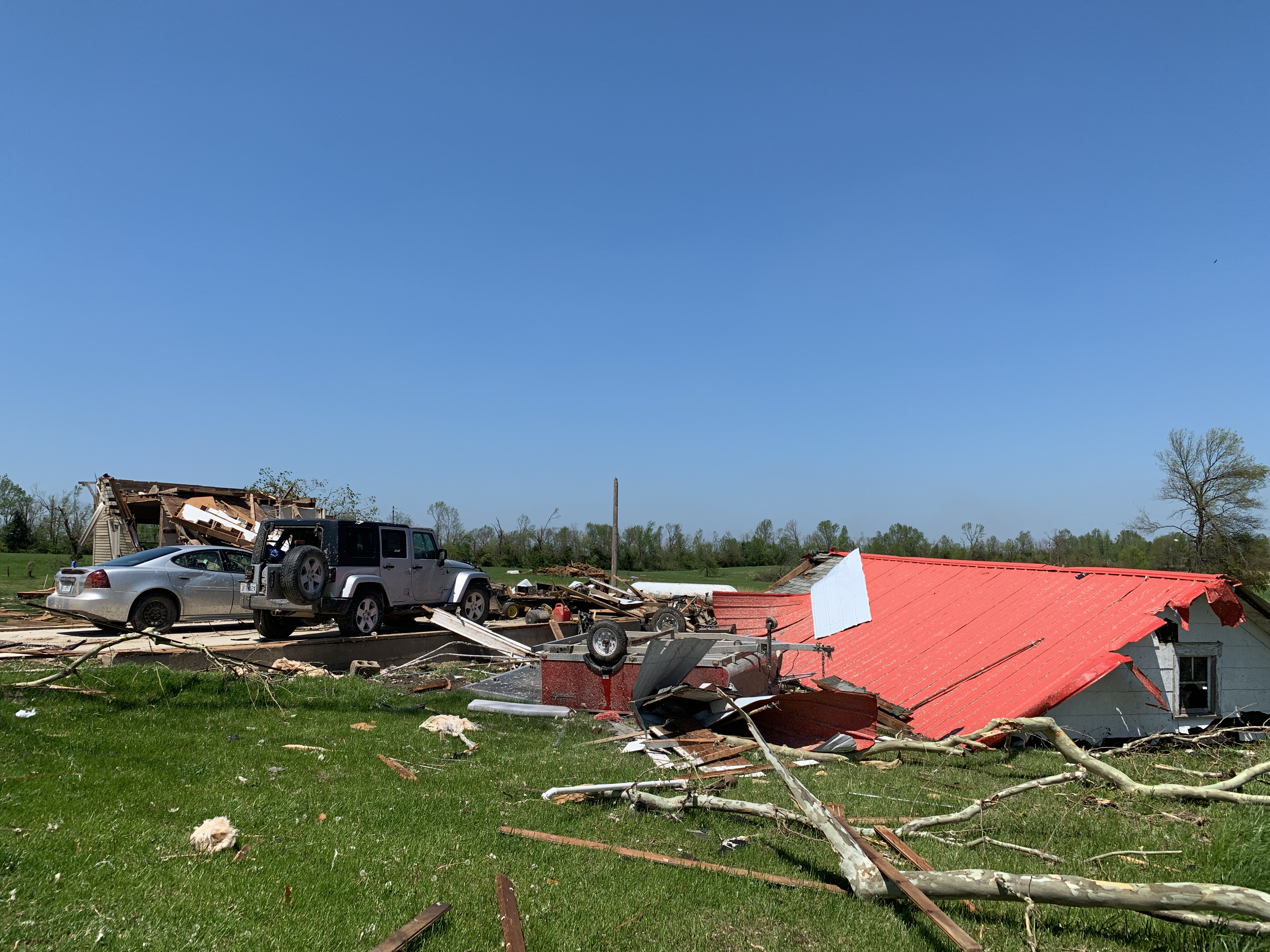
A home that was destroyed at high-end EF2 intensity north of Linneus, Missouri.

A line of severe storms pushed through southern Louisiana early on May 6, producing damaging winds. One low-end EF1 tornado near Morse damaged several homes, destroyed outbuildings, and injured one person. Later that day, a severe weather outbreak impacted the central United States. Multiple tornadoes touched down in Minnesota and South Dakota; all were weak and remained over open country, causing no damage. A supercell thunderstorm produced multiple tornadoes in Missouri, including one high-end EF0 tornado that damaged the roofs of several homes and a church in Trenton and a high-end EF2 tornado north of Linneus that damaged or destroyed several homes and outbuildings. An EF1 tornado struck the Indiana University Southeast campus in New Albany, Indiana the next morning, downing trees, damaging apartment buildings, and injuring two people. An EF0 tornado caused minor damage to homes and trees in Georgetown. An EF1 tornado moved through parts of Louisville, Kentucky and the suburb of Shively, snapping many trees and downing large limbs. In Shelbyville, a brief EF0 tornado damaged a gas station and a Stanley Black & Decker plant. In Iowa, an EF1 tornado damaged large outbuildings, trees, and a batting cage in West Liberty. A Taylor Swift Eras Tour concert in Nashville was delayed for a number of hours due to severe storms in the area. In all, 24 tornadoes were confirmed, and damage from the outbreak totaled $1.1 billion.

=== May 10–13 (United States) ===
EFU	EF0	EF1	EF2	EF3	EF4	EF5
43	28	24	5	0	0	0

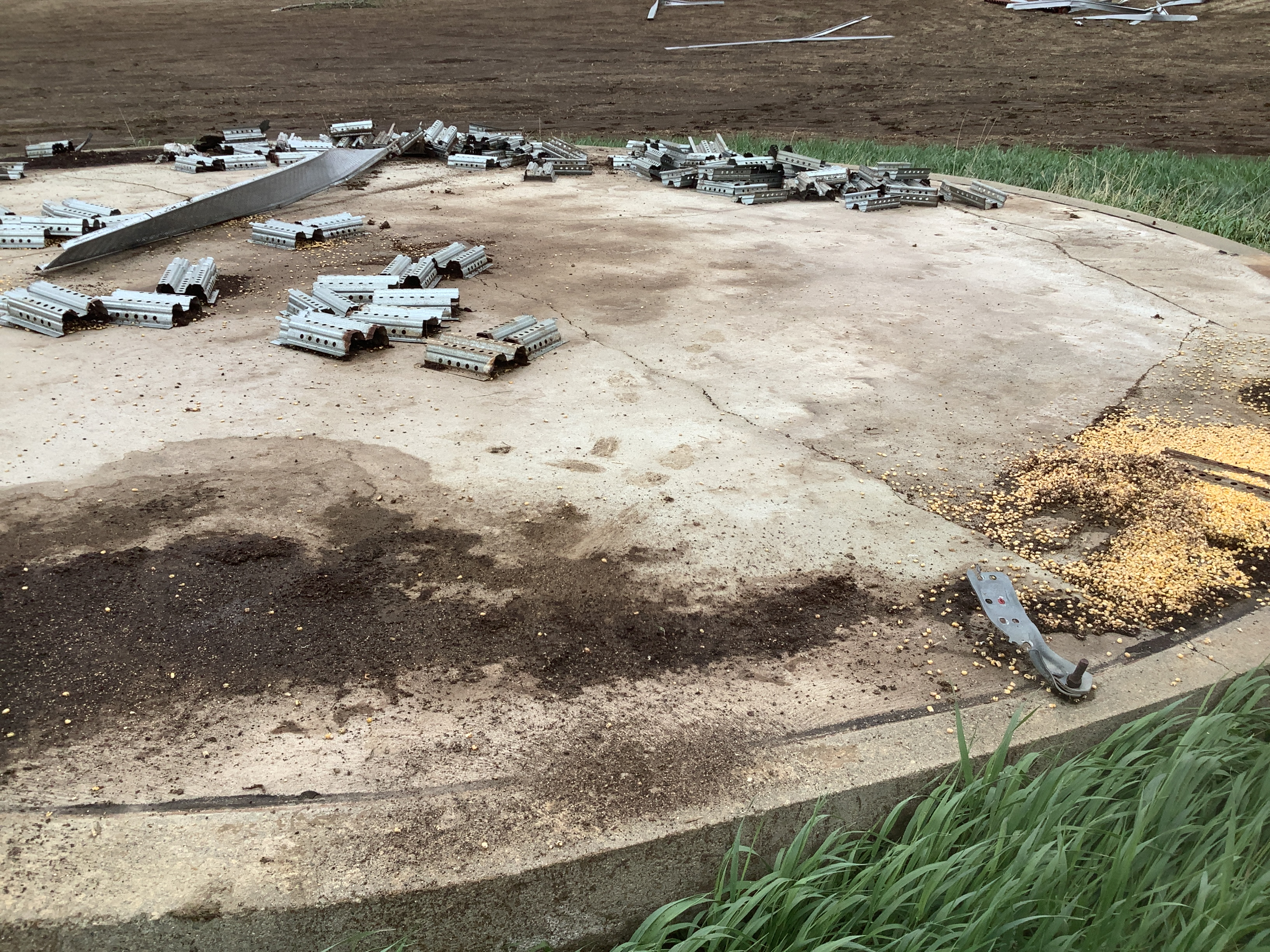
Remnants of a grain bin destroyed southwest of Lyons, Nebraska by an EF2 tornado.

Between May 10 and May 13, a tornado outbreak affected the Great Plains. Multiple weak tornadoes touched down in Colorado on May 10, including an EF1 tornado that unroofed a cabin near Woodrow. Two EFU tornadoes that caused no damage were confirmed in Arkansas and Kansas. On May 11, the SPC issued an enhanced risk for the central Great Plains and a slight risk for part of the Gulf Coast, and numerous weak tornadoes touched down in both areas. An EF1 tornado downed trees and damaged buildings in Shreveport, Louisiana, and a high-end EF1 multiple-vortex tornado caused considerable damage to school buildings, outbuildings, homes, and power poles in Weskan, Kansas. In Oklahoma, a high-end EF1 tornado heavily damaged homes and destroyed outbuildings near Cole before it weakened and caused minor tree and roof-shingle damage in Goldsby. Another EF1 tornado struck Noble, where a donut shop had its roof blown off and other businesses had severe roof damage. Denver had its eighth-wettest day on record, and hail forced a ground stop at Denver International Airport. Amtrak's northbound Heartland Flyer was delayed for almost three hours that day due to severe-weather warnings north of the Purcell, Oklahoma station.

Another enhanced risk was issued on May 12 for Nebraska, where multiple tornadoes occurred. They included two large EF2 tornadoes that passed near Uehling and Lyons, destroying numerous barns, garages, grain bins, and farm buildings and damaging several homes. The tornadoes also snapped many power poles, downed numerous trees, and damaged farming equipment. The Lyons tornado caused two injuries. A low-end EF2 tornado near North Bend damaged or destroyed grain bins and outbuildings, flipped irrigation pivot sprinklers, and shifted a house slightly off its foundation. A narrow EF2 tornado caused severe tree damage near Chambers, including some debarking. A high-end EF1 tornado struck Anselmo, where a shed was flipped, many trees were snapped, and tree branches were driven into building exteriors. A large, multiple-vortex wedge tornado near Greeley and Spalding flipped and bent irrigation pivots, blew out the windows of two vehicles, scoured gravel off a dirt road, and damaged trees and power poles. It was rated high-end EF1, although storm chaser and meteorologist Reed Timmer recorded a 163-mile-per-hour (262 km/h) wind gust as it passed over his SRV Dominator storm research vehicle, indicating that it was capable of producing high-end EF3 damage. Other tornadoes touched down in Oklahoma and Kansas, including a low-end EF2 tornado near Hamlin, Kansas that snapped trees, destroyed an outbuilding, heavily damaged a trailer, and damaged a house. A high-end EF1 tornado struck Laguna Heights, Texas early on the morning of May 13, where numerous poorly built mobile homes were heavily damaged or destroyed, and a man inside one of them was killed. Businesses and industrial buildings in Laguna Heights also sustained major damage, and 11 people were injured. More tornadoes touched down later that afternoon across Iowa, with others in Illinois, Oklahoma, and New Mexico; all were weak, causing little or no damage. Basements and roads were flooded in Laurens and Knoxville, Iowa, as rainfall neared 7 in (180 mm) in parts of the state. The threat of tornadoes across Iowa prompted Donald Trump to cancel outdoor rallies. In all, 94 tornadoes were confirmed, along with one tornado-related fatality, and $2.4 billion in damage.

== June ==
=== June 1 (China) ===
EFU	EF0	EF1	EF2	EF3	EF4	EF5
?	3	1	1	0	0	0

Multiple tornadoes impacted parts of Liaoning Province in northeastern China on June 1. A high-end EF1 tornado caused significant damage as it moved through parts of Fuxin and areas outside of the city, inflicting severe damage to at least 60 homes. Multiple apartment buildings and other structures were also heavily damaged, and buildings were destroyed at a coal mine. Cars and tractors were tossed and damaged, and trees and power lines were downed as well. Thirteen people were injured. A narrow but strong EF2 tornado impacted farms and rural areas outside Kaiyuan, destroying homes and outbuildings, snapping trees, and scouring crops in fields. Kaiyuan had been hit by a violent EF4 tornado in July 2019. Three EF0 tornadoes were confirmed, including one in the Shenyang area, along with another one near Huludao. At least 5 tornadoes were confirmed, while a few other unconfirmed reports of tornadoes were also received.

=== June 14–19 (United States) ===
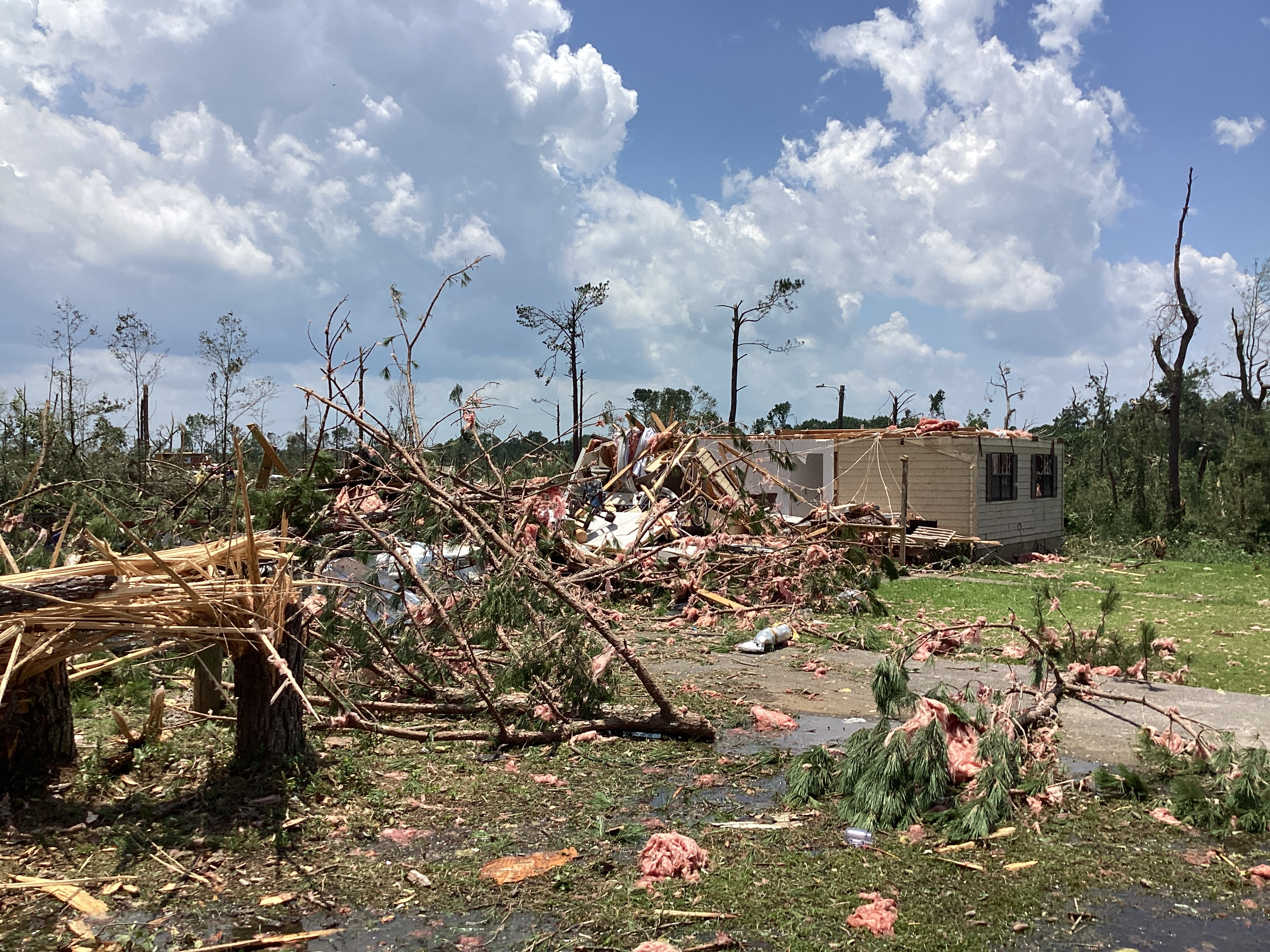
EF3 damage to a home near Louin, Mississippi.

EFU	EF0	EF1	EF2	EF3	EF4	EF5
7	37	35	12	2	0	0

Multiple rounds of severe thunderstorms and strong tornadoes impacted a large portion of the South, the Midwest, and the Great Plains in mid-June. The unusual outbreak sequence produced strong tornadoes in the Deep South, a region that rarely sees significant tornado activity late in the season except for tornadoes spawned by tropical cyclones. On June 14, the SPC issued a moderate risk for parts of the southern United States, including a 10% risk area for tornadoes. A number of severe-thunderstorm and tornado watches were issued from the Ark-La-Tex region to northern Florida, and numerous supercells formed later that day. A large EF2 tornado moved between Blakely and Arlington, Georgia, significantly damaging trees, outbuildings, and several homes. Two EF1 tornadoes caused considerable damage in Abbeville and Eufaula, Alabama, and an EF2 tornado severely damaged an industrial building and flipped cars in Cass County, Texas. There were over 300 reports of large hail and damaging winds, including wind gusts reaching 82 mph (132 km/h) and hail up to 5 inches (13 cm) in diameter in Mississippi. On June 15, the SPC issued a moderate risk of severe weather across much of Oklahoma, a small part of Texas, and Kansas. This included a 45% risk area for large hail and damaging winds, and a 10% risk area for tornadoes in the eastern Texas and Oklahoma panhandles, along with southwestern Oklahoma. That afternoon, rounds of intense supercells formed across the region and pushed eastward. One produced a destructive EF3 tornado that tracked through Perryton, Texas, which inflicted major damage to brick buildings in the downtown area, destroyed many homes, vehicles, and industrial buildings, killed three people, and injured at least 100 others. An EF2 tornado near Loco, Oklahoma, damaged or destroyed several homes, destroyed outbuildings, and snapped many trees and power poles. Other tornadoes were confirmed in Oklahoma and Texas, along with significant straight-line wind and hail damage. Farther north and well outside of the risk area, supercell thunderstorms unexpectedly developed along western Lake Erie and moved southeast. These supercells produced multiple tornadoes in Ohio, including three that were rated EF2. One caused extensive damage in the Point Place neighborhood in Toledo, Ohio. Severe weather also continued to impact the Gulf Coast and the Southeast later that night into the early morning of June 16, where many instances of damaging winds, large hail and isolated tornadoes were reported. An EF2 tornado hit Pensacola Beach, Florida, heavily damaging homes and tossing boats. Flash flooding in Pensacola, Florida, was caused by 9.23 in (234 mm) of rain in five hours and strong straight-line winds blew a tree into a house, killing one person. Flooding triggered a flash flood emergency. Two weak tornadoes touched down in the Philadelphia metropolitan area, and more weak tornadoes touched down in Texas, Florida, Mississippi, Alabama, and Virginia. By June 16, the storms had left 664,000 customers without power along the Gulf Coast.

Although more rounds of severe storms occurred on June 17, tornado activity was limited to a few weak tornadoes in Texas and Colorado. Later that night, however, a powerful mesoscale convective system (MCS) pushed through north and central Oklahoma. The Oklahoma City and Tulsa metropolitan areas had widespread wind damage, with the latter seeing wind gusts up to 100 miles per hour (160 km/h). The MCS produced multiple weak tornadoes near Tulsa during the early morning of June 18. The SPC issued an enhanced risk for parts of the Deep South later that morning, and strong tornadoes touched down in Arkansas and Mississippi. An EF2 tornado hit the rural community of Prairie View, Arkansas, where chicken houses, garages, and outbuildings were destroyed and many trees were snapped. Later that night, a destructive EF3 tornado near Louin, Mississippi, severely damaged or destroyed numerous homes and industrial buildings, flipped vehicles, flattened large swaths of trees, killed one person, and injured 25 others. Scattered tornadoes occurred across the same region on June 19, including a high-end EF2 that caused significant damage and injured six people in Moss Point, Mississippi. A total of 88 tornadoes were confirmed in the outbreak sequence, which resulted in four tornado-related deaths, along with one indirect fatality.

=== June 20–26 (United States and Canada) ===
EFU	EF0	EF1	EF2	EF3	EF4	EF5
61	19	22	11	2	0	0

In late June, multiple rounds of significant tornadic activity swept across the Great Plains, Mississippi Valley, the Southeastern and Northeastern United States, Manitoba and Ontario the day after the previous outbreak sequence came to an end. A high-end EF3 tornado struck western Matador, Texas on the evening of June 21, causing devastating damage, four fatalities, and 15 injuries. Homes along the path of the tornado were leveled or completely swept away, with debris scattered across fields. Businesses were flattened, trees were entirely debarked and stripped of branches, and significant ground scouring was documented. Extreme damage to vehicles occurred along the path of the tornado, with cars thrown long distances and mangled beyond recognition. Thirty-seven tornadoes touched down in Colorado that day, 27 of which were spawned by one slow-moving supercell. A severe hailstorm moved through the Denver metropolitan area, causing nearly 100 injuries at the Red Rocks Amphitheater before a concert. Severe weather in Colorado postponed a Major League Soccer game between the Colorado Rapids and Vancouver Whitecaps. A severe squall line produced a record wind gust of 97 mph (156 km/h) at George Bush Intercontinental Airport in Houston, surpassing the record set by Hurricane Ike. On June 22, isolated weak tornadoes occurred from Colorado to North Carolina. A rain-wrapped EF1 tornado moved through the Denver suburb of Highlands Ranch, causing widespread tree and roof damage. An outbreak of strong tornadoes occurred on June 23, with tornadoes reported in Wyoming and Colorado. This included an EF3 tornado that destroyed a farmstead and debarked trees near Granada, Colorado. An EF2 tornado struck the North Antelope Rochelle Mine in Campbell County, Wyoming, injuring eight workers. A rain-wrapped EF2 tornado near Hawk Springs caused significant damage to power poles and outbuildings and flipped a semi-truck, injuring the driver. Another EF2 tornado in Nebraska prompted the issuance of a tornado emergency as it passed near Scottsbluff and Gering, destroying a house, tossing cars, and injuring one person. More tornadoes touched down over Minnesota and Iowa on June 24, including an EF2 tornado that passed just east of Mahnomen, Minnesota. A few more strong tornadoes occurred the next day in Indiana and Kentucky which included an EF2 tornado that struck Rusk, Indiana, killing one person and injuring another when it destroyed a cabin. Additional weak tornadoes occurred across a wide area on June 26 before the outbreak ended, including several tornadoes confirmed in Ontario. 115 tornadoes were confirmed in the outbreak sequence, which resulted in five tornadic deaths, three non-tornadic deaths, and over 120 injuries.

=== June 22 (Philippines) ===
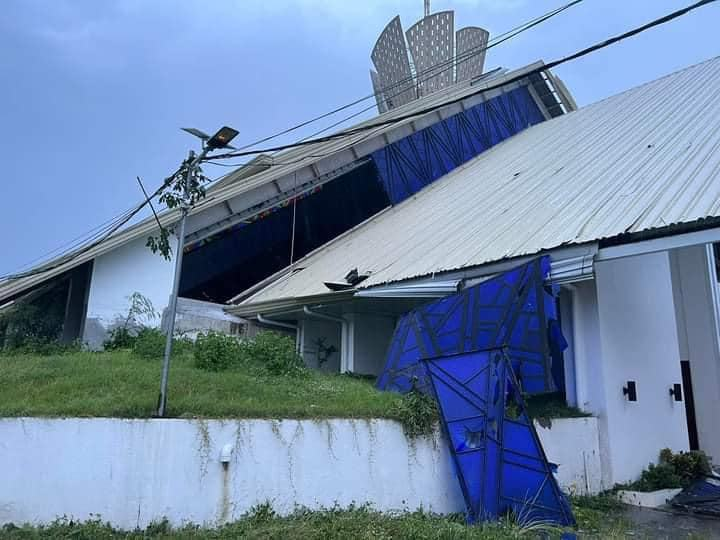
The windows of Cabalantian Church in Bacolor, Pampanga that were damaged by a tornado.

On June 22 at 5:30 p.m. PHT (09:30 UTC), a severe thunderstorm produced a tornado that struck the neighborhood of Barangay Cabalantian in the town of Bacolor, Pampanga in the Philippines. It struck residential areas and blew away portions of rooftops, uprooted trees, and toppled power lines that caused a power outage. A total of 33 buildings were partially damaged, including a supermarket and a gas station, while 7 other buildings were destroyed. A local church also suffered damage as its windows were shattered and parts of the ceiling collapsed. Around 40 families were affected by the incident and 3 people were injured by flying debris.

== July ==
=== July 1 (Canada) ===
On July 1, a violent (C)EF4 tornado, (Note: Canada uses a different version of the Enhanced Fujita scale, which is still commonly called the "EF-scale". The Canadian version of the scale is officially known as the "Canadian Enhanced Fujita scale" or "CEF-scale".) estimated at 620 m (680 yd) wide, struck rural Mountain View County, Alberta, Canada at 1:45 p.m. MDT (19:45 UTC). The tornado touched down over open farmland, produced its most severe damage as it moved to the east between Didsbury and Carstairs, and later dissipated after it crossed Highway 2. Three homes were destroyed, four were heavily damaged, and five were damaged to a lesser degree. A gas leak was reported at one destroyed home. The joint damage survey from Environment and Climate Change Canada (ECCC), the Prairie and Arctic Storm Prediction Centre (PASPC), and the Northern Tornadoes Project (NTP) assigned a maximum rating of low-end EF4 based on major damage at a farmstead, where a well-built house was completely leveled with debris scattered across nearby fields. Peak wind speeds at this location were estimated at 275 km/h (171 mph). One person was injured by debris while sheltering in the basement of the house. A large 22,000-pound (10,000 kg) harvester combine near this home was thrown 50 m (160 ft) before being rolled a further 50 to 100 m (160 to 330 ft). Other heavy pieces of farm equipment and machinery were also flipped and tossed at this property, and a pickup truck was thrown at another location. Twenty-five cows, twenty chickens, and one horse were killed by the tornado, many large trees were snapped or uprooted at several locations along the path, and some were stripped of their branches and sustained severe debarking. The tornado also left behind a large swath of extensive ground scouring in farm fields near Didsbury. Multiple power poles were snapped, and numerous sheds, farm outbuildings, and large barns were destroyed, including some that were completely swept away. The tornado was highly visible and was caught on video and photographed by several storm chasers and local residents. This was only the third violent tornado in Alberta history, after the 1987 Edmonton tornado and the 1915 Grassy Lake tornado (also known as the Redcliff Cyclone).

=== July 12–13 (United States and Canada) ===
EFU	EF0	EF1	EF2	EF3	EF4	EF5
1	18	9	1	0	0	0

On July 12, the SPC issued an enhanced risk of severe weather for eastern Kansas and western Missouri, along with a smaller secondary enhanced risk for the Chicago metropolitan area, including a 10% risk of tornadoes. A line of severe thunderstorms moved through Nebraska and Iowa in the early morning and produced a few tornadoes, including an EF2 tornado that tore the roof off of a home, destroyed a shed and grain bins, and snapped trees near Logan, Iowa. In Nebraska, the towns of Howells and Bancroft were hit by EF1 tornadoes. Later that day, multiple EF0 and EF1 tornadoes touched down in the suburbs of Chicago. This included a high-end EF1 tornado that moved through Burr Ridge, McCook, and Stickney, severely damaging multiple warehouses, inflicting heavy roof damage to homes and businesses, snapping many trees and power poles, and overturning a semi-truck, injuring the driver. Two simultaneous tornadoes moved through Elgin, one of which was rated EF1 while the other was rated EF0. The EF1 tornado destroyed garages, inflicted considerable roof damage to a church and multiple homes, and downed numerous trees. The EF0 tornado caused mainly tree damage, but also damaged one house. Two EF0 tornadoes caused minor damage at and around Chicago O'Hare International Airport as well. A total of 172 flights were cancelled and over 550 flights were delayed at the airport as a result of the severe weather. The storms moved into Ontario and Quebec the following day, with seven tornadoes confirmed by Environment and Climate Change Canada and the Northern Tornadoes Project. The first two, both of which were rated EF1, touched down one minute apart in the Ottawa suburb of Barrhaven, where a couple of apartment buildings and 125 homes were damaged, a few of which sustained heavy roof damage and broken windows. Trees and fences were also toppled by the two tornadoes, and one person in Barrhaven suffered minor injuries. The third was an EF0 tornado that hit Embrun, Ontario, where minor tree and roof damage occurred, while the fourth tornado caused EF0 tree and crop damage near Fournier, Ontario. The fifth was an EF0 tornado that touched down near Montréal–Mirabel International Airport, causing no damage. The sixth, an EF0 tornado near Saint-Thomas, Quebec damaged two barns, the roof of a house, trees, and crops. The seventh tornado caused EF1 damage to trees in a wooded area to the north of Saint-Roch-de-l'Achigan. In the United States, additional isolated weak tornadoes touched down in Vermont, Wisconsin, and Colorado. A total of 29 tornadoes were confirmed.

=== July 12 (Brazil) ===
On July 12, a long-tracked severe thunderstorm moved through Rio Grande do Sul, Brazil, causing damage along a path of about 112 kilometres (70 mi). The storm produced a tornado that caused severe damage to homes, buildings, and vehicles in the town of Sede Nova, where numerous trees and power poles were downed as well, and 11 people were injured. The tornado also caused significant damage to trees and farms in rural areas outside of Sede Nova, and was rated EF3. While one single tornado was confirmed, it may have been a tornado family.

=== July 15 (Russia) ===
IFU	IF0	IF0.5	IF1	IF1.5	IF2	IF2.5	IF3	IF4	IF5
0	1	0	4	6	2	0	0	0	0

On July 15, severe thunderstorms produced multiple tornadoes that impacted very rural areas in Russia. Several tornadic tracks were found in remote forests using Sentinel-2 satellite data, and were not noticed until late 2025. This included an IF2 rated tornado that touched down near Tsentral'nyi, traveling a total length of 38.7 kilometers (24 mi), reaching a total path width of 1200 meters (1312.3 yd), and snapping and uprooting countless trees. Another IF2 rated tornado touched down near Chernyshevka, being the widest tornado of the day as it left behind a 1250 meter-wide (1367 yd) swath of major tree damage. Several other weaker tornadoes also occurred in the remote forests, including a long-tracked IF1.5 tornado that traveled 28.11 kilometers (17.4 mi) through areas near the town of Satka, Russia. A total of 13 tornadoes were confirmed.

=== July 17 (China) ===
On July 17, a tornado spawned by Tropical Storm Talim struck parts of the Chinese city of Danzhou. The tornado caused significant damage to trees and structures. The tornado wasn't officially rated, but was estimated to have reached EF2 intensity.

=== July 19 (North Carolina) ===
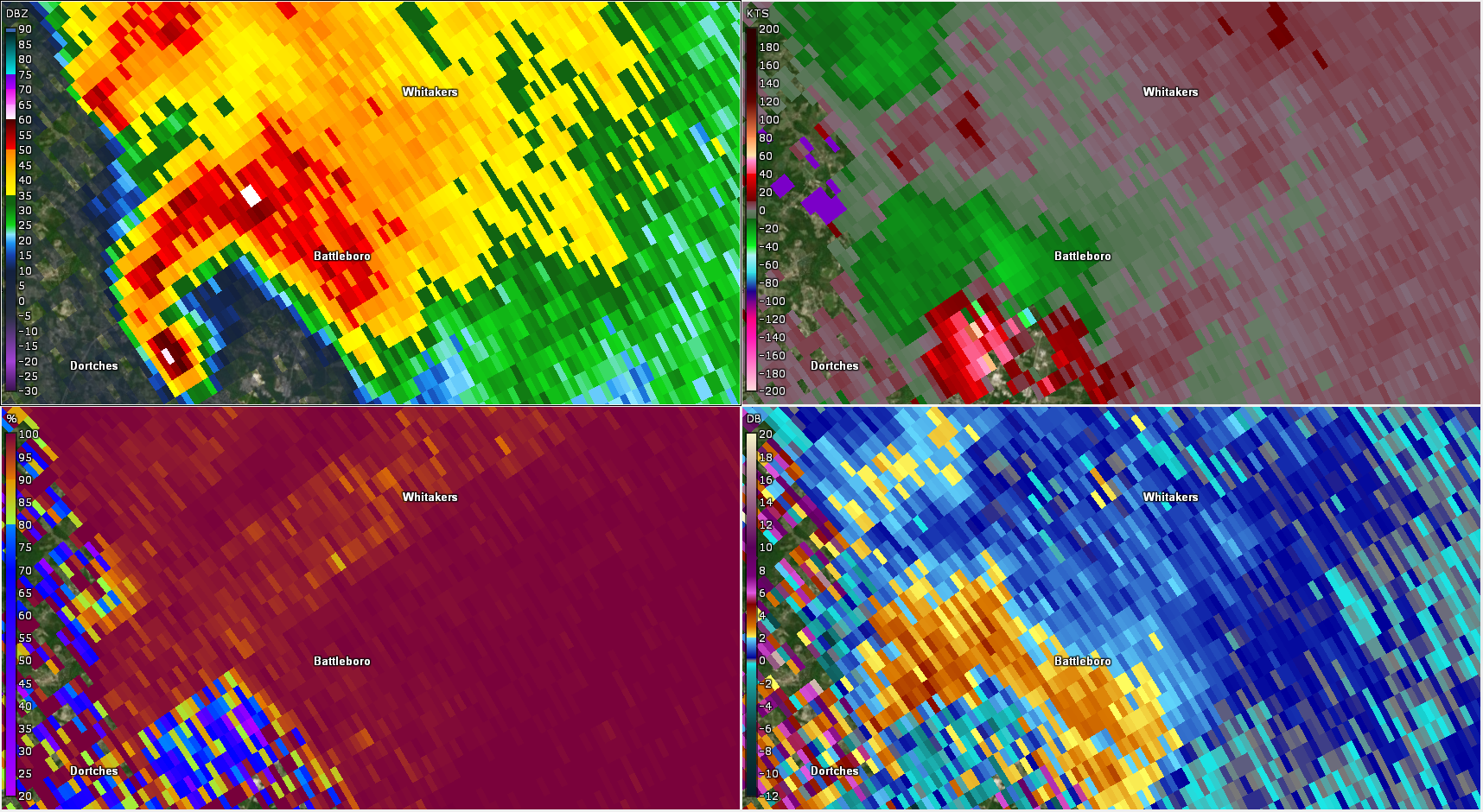
Radar scan of the EF3 Dortches, North Carolina tornado. A hook echo is visible on the top left and a debris signature on the bottom left.

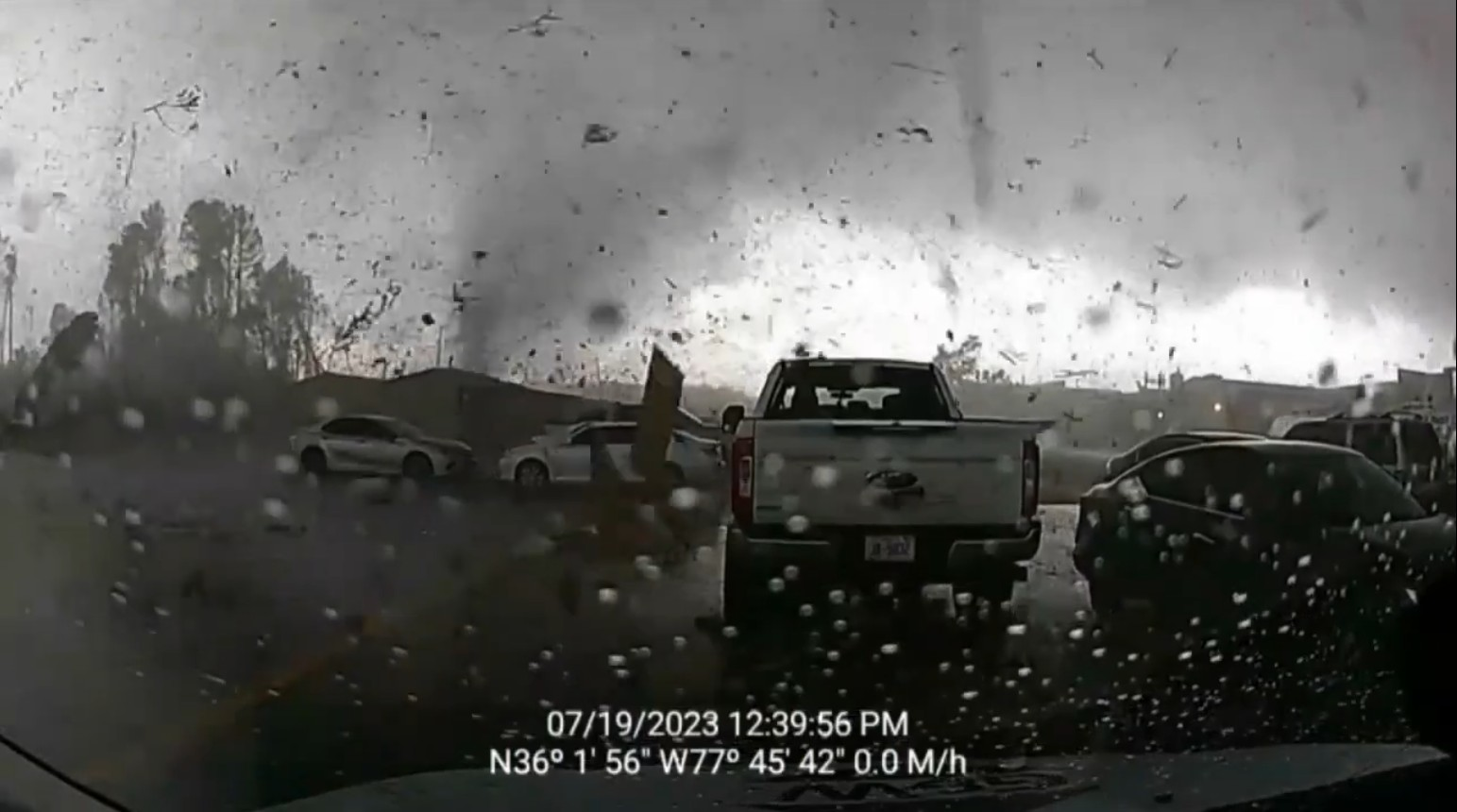
The Dortches tornado captured by a dash-cam near Battleboro.

An isolated but intense EF3 multiple-vortex tornado touched down in Nash County, North Carolina on July 19. The tornado first struck the town of Dortches, completely destroying several mobile homes and snapping many trees and power poles. The tornado exited Dortches and continued to the east-northeast, destroying a house, significantly damaging numerous other homes, and flattening a metal truss electrical transmission tower. As it passed near Battleboro, it partially destroyed a Pfizer warehouse and tossed multiple semi-trucks parked nearby. The tornado weakened as it moved away from Battleboro, and dissipated after it crossed into Edgecombe County. The tornado had estimated peak winds of 150 mph (240 km/h), reached a width of 600 yards (550 m) and a total path length of 16.5 miles (26.6 km). A total of 38 homes were damaged or destroyed along the path, and 16 people were injured. The National Weather Service office in Raleigh did not issue a tornado warning until the tornado had been on the ground for six minutes, which was questioned by some meteorologists on social media. The NWS defended its actions, noting that the warning was issued before the tornado did its most significant damage. After law enforcement reported that up to 50,000 pallets of medicine had been damaged at the Pfizer facility, Erin Fox of University of Utah Health stated that there could be shortages of certain drugs while the company dealt with the situation. FDA Commissioner Robert Califf later announced that since hospitals already had the drugs or the drugs were on their way, no significant supply impacts were expected. Pfizer said that since the tornado damaged storage areas but not production equipment, any shortages would be minor. The tornado caused over $300 million (2023 USD) in damage.

=== July 22 (Europe) ===
IFU	IF0	IF0.5	IF1	IF1.5	IF2	IF2.5	IF3	IF4	IF5
0	0	0	1	0	0	0	1	0	0

On July 22, a strong rain-wrapped tornado caused significant damage in Northern Italy as it tracked 14 kilometres (8.7 mi) through areas in and around Alfonsine, Emilia-Romagna. Numerous well-built masonry homes suffered severe structural damage, some of which suffered total loss of roofs and exterior walls, including a few that sustained partial structural collapse or complete destruction of their upper floors. The tornado collapsed several steel truss electrical transmission towers, toppled large metal light poles and signs, and also destroyed masonry outbuildings. Multiple cars and trucks were flipped or moved, and objects were lofted and thrown hundreds of meters. Trees along the path were snapped, uprooted, or stripped of their branches, and major crop damage occurred in agricultural fields as well. The tornado injured 14 people and was rated IF3 on the newly implemented International Fujita scale by the European Severe Storms Laboratory. In Belarus, an IF1 tornado snapped and uprooted trees in a forest near the village of Ganales.

== August ==
=== August 1 (Europe) ===
IFU	IF0	IF0.5	IF1	IF1.5	IF2	IF2.5	IF3	IF4	IF5
1	0	0	0	0	1	0	0	0	0

On August 1, a rare strong tornado touched down in Ilirska Bistrica, Slovenia, where 18 houses were damaged, five of which had their roofs completely torn off. Debris was scattered across yards, and trees were snapped or uprooted. The tornado, which was rated IF2/T3, was associated with an isolated supercell storm. Tornadoes are rare in Slovenia and neighboring countries, except Italy. The nearest official weather station, Koseze, reported 107 km/h (30 m/s; 66 mph) winds some distance from the tornado's path. Another tornado occurred near Jesolo, Italy, but it caused no damage and wasn't officially rated. The region had experienced uncommonly-severe storm systems in June and July 2023.

=== August 4–8 (United States) ===
EFU	EF0	EF1	EF2	EF3	EF4	EF5
16	15	17	4	2	0	0

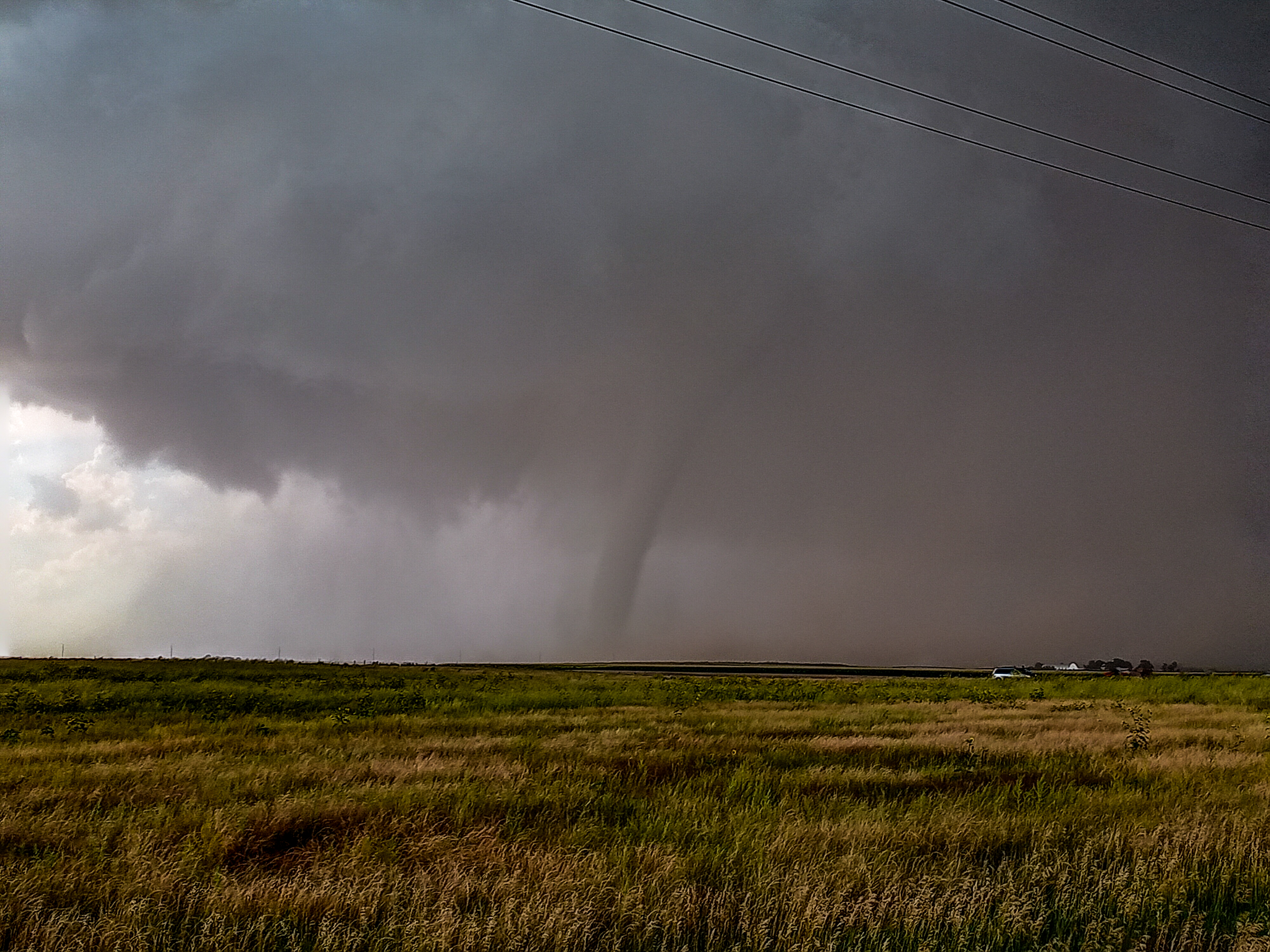
An EF3 tornado near Yuma, Colorado on August 8.

From August 4–8, an unusual late-season severe weather and tornado outbreak sequence affected multiple regions of the United States, producing numerous tornadoes that struck the Eastern United States, the Plains, the South, and the Midwest. Several of the tornadoes were strong and damaging, including an EF2 tornado that hit the town of Baring, Missouri on the night of August 4, causing extensive damage to homes, businesses, and other structures and injuring two people. A long-tracked EF2 tornado touched down north of Pawnee, Illinois in Sangamon County two days later, damaging or destroying homes and causing extensive tree damage as it passed near Kincaid and Taylorville before it dissipated near Assumption in Christian County, almost an hour after touching down. Later that night, three simultaneous tornadoes, one of which was rated EF0 and two of which were rated EF1, caused considerable damage in and around Paoli, Indiana. On August 7, a high-end EF2 tornado hit the west side of Knoxville, Tennessee, badly damaging some homes and an apartment complex. As the storm system brought hundreds of damaging-wind reports and produced many weak tornadoes throughout the Northeastern United States that day, a low-end EF3 tornado moved through southern Lewis County, New York, striking the town of Turin and causing significant damage at the Snow Ridge Ski Resort at the end of its 16-mile (26 km) path. On August 8, multiple storm chasers documented a highly visible EF3 stovepipe tornado that looped over its path multiple times outside of Yuma, Colorado, destroying well-built farm buildings and equipment, snapping large power poles, and severely damaging a house in rural Yuma County. Multiple other tornadoes touched down in Colorado that day as well, including an EF2 tornado that snapped power poles and damaged irrigation equipment near Idalia. Overall, this outbreak sequence produced a total of 54 tornadoes and injured two people, but didn't cause any tornado-related fatalities. However, the severe weather did result in two non-tornado related fatalities in South Carolina and Alabama.

=== August 13 (China) ===
On August 13, a narrow but strong EF2 tornado struck the Yancheng area in Jiangsu, causing severe damage in the villages of Longgang and Jiulongkou. A total of 283 residences were damaged or destroyed, including some small houses that were leveled. Thirty-two vegetable greenhouses were damaged or destroyed as well. Two people were killed by the tornado, and at least 15 others were injured.

=== August 18 (United States) ===
EFU	EF0	EF1	EF2	EF3	EF4	EF5
0	1	3	1	0	0	0

Multiple tornadoes impacted portions of southern New England on the morning of August 18. Three tornadoes touched down in Massachusetts, including an EF1 tornado that struck North Attleboro and Mansfield, snapping many trees and knocking over an air conditioning unit on the roof of a building. Another EF1 tornado snapped or uprooted trees and caused some roof damage in Weymouth, and an EF0 tornado caused minor damage in Stoughton. In Connecticut, an EF1 tornado downed more than 100 trees and damaged two homes as it passed near Windham and Scotland. The strongest tornado of the day touched down on the outskirts of Scituate, Rhode Island, producing low-end EF2 damage as it snapped or uprooted numerous large trees in a wooded area before it lofted and dropped a car on I-295 in Johnston, injuring the driver. The tornado toppled many additional trees onto homes in North Providence before it dissipated. It was the first F2/EF2 tornado in Rhode Island since 1986. Overall, a total of five tornadoes were confirmed. In addition to the tornadoes, flooding from the system shut down I-91 in Connecticut, and a nearby hotel parking lot flooded. Flooding created standing water along the Grand Central Parkway and Long Island Expressway in Queens, and resulted in ground stops at LaGuardia and Newark Liberty International Airports.

=== August 24–25 (United States and Canada) ===
EFU	EF0	EF1	EF2	EF3	EF4	EF5
2	6	14	4	0	0	0

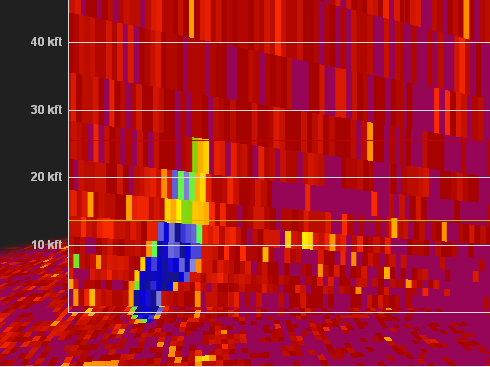
Tornado debris signature from the Webberville, Michigan EF2 tornado, showing debris being lofted to about 25,000 feet (7,600 m).

A severe weather and tornado outbreak occurred across parts of the Great Lakes and southwestern Ontario during the evening of August 24, including tornadoes that impacted the Grand Rapids, Detroit, and Cleveland metro areas. A strong EF2 tornado that passed near Williamston and Webberville, Michigan prompted a PDS tornado warning, tossing vehicles and killing two people as it moved along and across I-96. The tornado also flattened large swaths of trees in wooded areas, destroyed large barns, damaged multiple homes, scoured crops in farm fields, injured four people, and caused $75 million in damage. A high-end EF1 tornado struck the Grand Rapids suburb of Comstock Park, where a small business was destroyed, several other businesses and homes suffered considerable damage, and many large trees were snapped or uprooted. Weak tornadoes also caused minor to moderate damage in the Detroit suburbs of Canton, South Rockwood, and Gibraltar. In Ontario, two tornadoes touched down simultaneously and moved through the Windsor area. The first was an EF0 tornado that moved through the west side of Windsor, downing numerous trees and branches, removing roof shingles from homes, and damaging fences. To the east, an EF1 tornado collapsed barns, snapped power poles, damaged grain bins, downed trees and branches, and removed roof shingles from numerous homes as it passed east of Tecumseh and struck Elmstead before dissipating. Numerous tornadoes also touched down in Ohio, including a high-end EF1 tornado that blew most of the roof off of a church in eastern Cleveland. An EF2 tornado caused significant damage to industrial buildings as it moved through the Cleveland suburbs of Warrensville Heights and Bedford Heights, while a high-end EF1 tornado snapped or uprooted numerous large trees in Mentor. A brief low-end EF2 tornado completely destroyed a large barn near Middlefield as well. In the early morning hours of August 25, the severe storms moved into Pennsylvania, producing an EF1 tornado that downed trees in Connellsville and along the Youghiogheny River. An EF2 tornado impacted the community of Mill Run, where significant damage occurred at a local campground, countless large trees were snapped in wooded areas, and six people were injured. Overall, the outbreak produced 26 tornadoes and resulted in two tornado-related fatalities. Severe flooding and damaging winds also affected much of the region, and three deaths occurred after a weather-related vehicle accident. Another person was killed in Michigan when a tree fell on a home in Lansing. The storms cut power to over 700,000 customers in the Great Lakes region, and another 20,000 customers lost power in Ontario. Combined estimated economic losses reached $880 million.

=== August 25 (Russia) ===
IFU	IF0	IF0.5	IF1	IF1.5	IF2	IF2.5	IF3	IF4	IF5
1	0	0	2	3	3	0	0	0	0

On August 25, multiple tornadoes occurred in a very remote forested region of Russia. The tornado paths weren't discovered until 2025 following analysis of Sentinel-2 satellite imagery. The tornadoes occurred in unpopulated areas, and the damage they caused was limited to downed trees. The first tornado was rated IF1.5 rated and had a path length of 20.5 kilometers (12.7 mi), and a width of 1400 meters (1531 yd). A while later, a strong tornado tracked 29.6 kilometers (18.3 mi) near Karasevo, reaching a path width of 1400 meters (1531 yd) and producing IF2 tree damage. Another IF2 tornado touched down near Yagodnoye and tracked 22.75 kilometers (14.1 mi) through dense forest. The final significant tornado of the event, also rated IF2, was the longest tracked tornado of the day, causing major forest damage along a 40.1 kilometer (24.9 mi) path near Argat-Yul. A total of 8 tornadoes were confirmed.

== September ==
=== September 17 (Europe) ===
IFU	IF0	IF0.5	IF1	IF1.5	IF2	IF2.5	IF3	IF4	IF5
1	0	0	0	2	1	0	0	0	0

On September 17, four tornadoes impacted France and the United Kingdom. In France, brief unrated landspout tornado touched down near Séreilhac in Région Limousin, causing no damage. A strong cone tornado was photographed and caught on video from multiple angles as it struck rural areas near Ernée. The tornado damaged or completely destroyed multiple farm buildings, and debris from the structures was scattered across open fields. Trees were snapped, crops and concrete power poles were damaged, and livestock was injured. A dog was also lifted into the air by the tornado, and survived without injury. The French Observatory of Tornadoes and Violent Thunderstorms (Keraunos) rated the tornado EF2 on the Enhanced Fujita scale, with estimated winds of 175 to 225 kilometres per hour (109 to 140 mph). The European Severe Storms Laboratory rated the tornado IF2 on the International Fujita scale. An IF1.5 tornado occurred in L'île d'Aix as well, where a masonry wall was damaged, trees were snapped or uprooted, and a few catamarans were tossed around at a marina. Later that evening in England, an IF1.5/T2 tornado tracked through the western and northern suburbs of Littlehampton, impacting Wick and Lyminster. This tornado downed several trees, toppled brick garden walls, and shattered the windows of at least 20 cars and multiple houses. One person sustained minor leg injuries.

=== September 19 (China) ===
EFU	EF0	EF1	EF2	EF3	EF4	EF5
0	1	5	1	2	0	0

A small but significant tornado outbreak occurred in China on September 19. Two strong tornadoes struck the city of Suqian, Jiangsu, killing five people and injuring four others. About 1,600 homes were damaged or destroyed by the Suqian tornadoes, while businesses also sustained major damage, vehicles were flipped, and trees and power lines were downed. One of the two tornadoes was rated EF2, while the other received an EF3 rating. The EF3 Suqian tornado toppled several metal truss electrical transmission towers, and was responsible for all five fatalities. Another EF3 tornado struck parts of Funing, Jiangsu, also killing five and injuring four. Brick homes were destroyed by the Funing tornado, and severe damage to crops, trees, and power lines occurred as well. In 2016, this same area was devastated by a violent EF4 tornado that killed 98 people. Several additional weak tornadoes also touched down, causing minor to moderate damage. In all, nine tornadoes and 10 fatalities were confirmed as a result of this tornado outbreak.

=== September 19 (Denmark) ===
A significant tornado occurred in Jammerbugt Municipality in northern Denmark on September 19, impacting the community of Grønhøj Strand near Ingstrup. A mobile home was destroyed after being picked up and thrown 20 meters, other mobile homes and caravans were overturned or moved, a shed was destroyed, and crops were damaged in fields. According to the ESSL, the tornado had a track length of 1.22 km, a maximum path width of 140 meters, and a maximum intensity of IF2.

=== September 21 (Germany) ===
On September 21, a severe thunderstorm in western Germany spawned a strong IF2 tornado that moved through parts of Rhineland-Palatinate, causing damage in and around several small towns. The tornado first touched down in Hommerdingen, where homes sustained roof damage and a couple of small farm buildings were damaged or destroyed. It strengthened as it hit the neighboring town of Nusbaum, where well-built masonry homes and buildings had their roofs torn off, a few outbuildings were destroyed, and large trees were snapped. The tornado maintained its strength as it exited Nusbaum and struck a rural property just northeast of town, where more large trees were snapped or stripped of their branches and a house was completely unroofed. Continuing to the northeast, the tornado weakened as it downed some trees and tree limbs in and around Halsdorf. The damage path turned in a more north-northeasterly direction as the tornado impacted Bettingen and Mülbach, inflicting minor roof tile damage and snapping trees in both towns. Additional tree damage occurred near Brecht and Wißmannsdorf before the tornado dissipated. Two people were injured by the tornado, which was on the ground for 13 km and had a maximum path width of 200 meters.

== October ==
=== October 4 (Brazil) ===
On October 4, a strong tornado occurred in southern Brazil, affecting the city of Cascavel in Paraná. Roofs and trees were significantly damaged, and a building was destroyed. The tornado was rated F2 by SIMEPAR.

=== October 28 (United Kingdom) ===
For the second time in just over one month, another tornado struck the town of Littlehampton. Several trees were snapped, fence panels were destroyed, power lines were brought down, car windows were smashed, and one house had its roof ripped off. A TORRO investigator visited the site on October 29, and confirmed the tornado. It was provisionally rated T4 on the TORRO scale, equivalent to a low-end F2 tornado. The European Severe Weather Database rated the tornado IF2 on the International Fujita scale.

== November ==
=== November 1–4 (Europe) ===
IFU	IF0	IF0.5	IF1	IF1.5	IF2	IF2.5	IF3	IF4	IF5
1	0	0	4	1	1	0	2	0	0

A significant tornado touched down in Jersey, Channel Islands, from the evening of November 1 into the morning of November 2. One house had its roof ripped off and its upper-story walls destroyed. The tornado was rated IF3 by the European Severe Storms Laboratory on the International Fujita scale (IF-scale). TORRO released a statement on November 6 rating the tornado T6 on the TORRO scale, equivalent to a low-end F3 tornado. On the morning of November 2, another tornado was confirmed in Sompting and northern Lancing in West Sussex. After surveying the damage and reports from the public, the tornado's track was mapped and TORRO rated it as T2 on the TORRO scale. An IF1 tornado struck parts of Castel Focognano in Italy later that day, damaging roofs and trees. On November 4, an intense tornado struck Lavino in Bulgaria. According to the European Severe Storms Laboratory, at least 150 structures were damaged; one person was slightly injured by the IF3 tornado. A significant tornado struck Xánthi, Greece, about a half-hour later, and a large tree branch fell on a moving bus. With a damage path of at least 1.5 km (between Geor. Kondyli street and EPS stadiums), the tornado was rated IF2. An unrated tornado struck parts of Sratsimir, Bulgaria, an IF1.5 tornado struck parts of Dereköy, Turkey, and an IF1 tornado struck parts of La Pouëze, France.

=== November 15 (Brazil) ===
An F2 tornado killed one woman in Giruá, injuring an additional 57 people.

=== November 25 (Greece) ===
An IF2 tornado which significantly damaged greenhouses and trees was observed in Phalasarna.

== December ==
=== December 9–10 (United States) ===
EFU	EF0	EF1	EF2	EF3	EF4	EF5
0	4	9	4	1	0	0

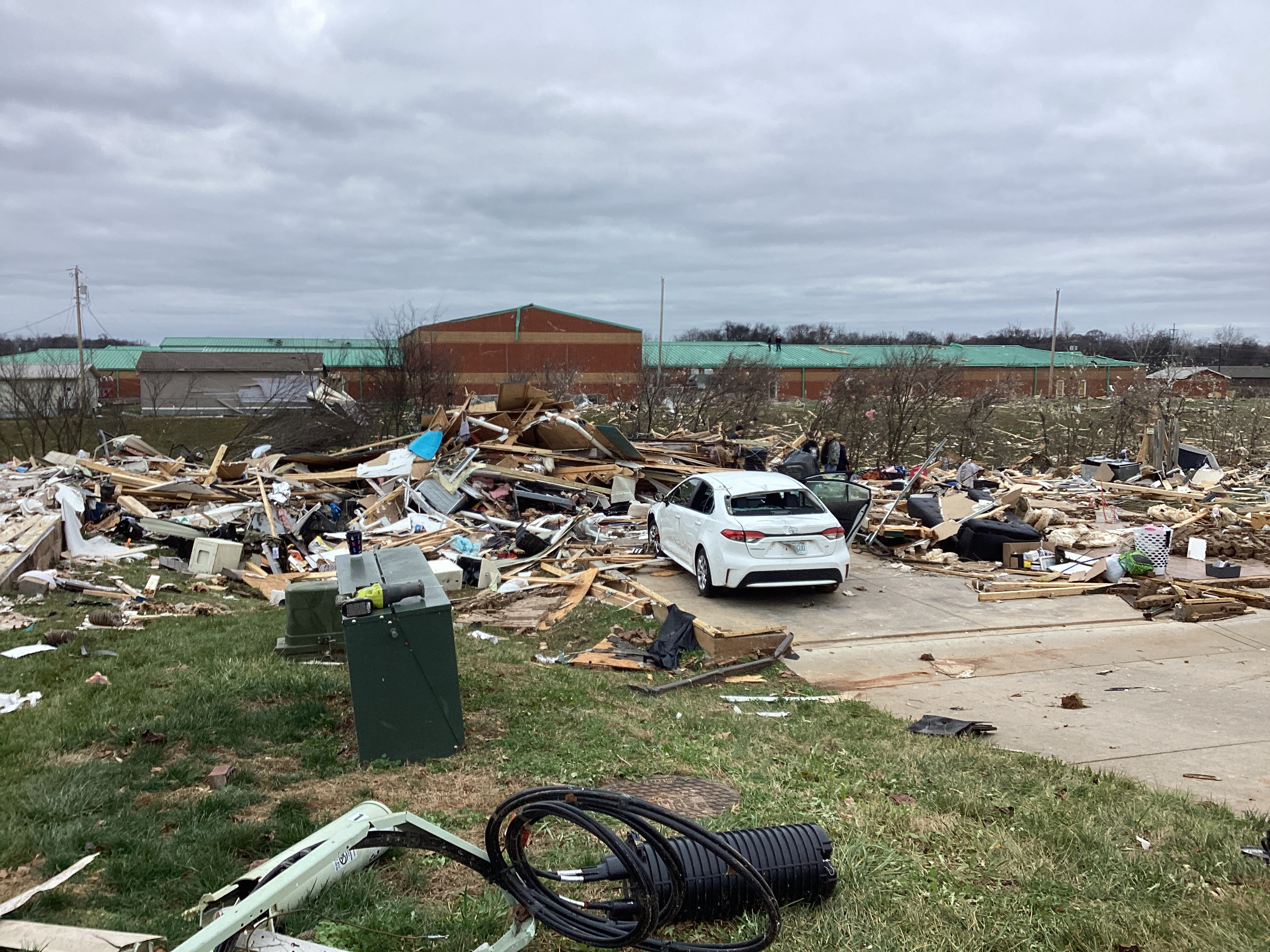
A home destroyed at EF3 intensity north of Clarksville, with debris thrown 200 yards (180 m).

A severe-weather and tornado outbreak struck portions of the southern United States on December 9, especially the state of Tennessee. An EF1 tornado impacted portions of Weakley County, Tennessee (including Sharon and Dresden, causing three injuries before causing significant damage in parts of Rutherford and across Gibson County. An EF3 tornado struck northwest Clarksville, Tennessee, and surrounding areas of Tennessee and Kentucky. Three people were killed, 62 were injured, and at least 20,000 people lost power. A fourth victim succumbed to their injuries on December 16. A strong EF2 tornado prompted a tornado emergency for Hendersonville and Gallatin, Tennessee, after it struck Madison in northern Nashville, where heavy damage occurred and three people were killed. The tornado also injured three people elsewhere. More tornadoes occurred the next day, including an EF1 tornado in Wake County, North Carolina, west of Garner. Eighteen tornadoes touched down during the outbreak.

=== December 10 (Ireland) ===
A significant tornado touched down in Leitrim, County Leitrim, Ireland. The tornado, which was filmed from multiple angles, slightly injured two people. The European Severe Storms Laboratory rated the tornado IF2 due to roof damage.

=== December 12 (Australia) ===
A tornado was confirmed by the Bureau of Meteorology in the town of Millicent, South Australia as storms tore across the state. The tornado uprooted trees, downed power lines, and damaged homes and outbuildings.

=== December 21 (Germany) ===
A significant tornado passed through the German city of Cologne. Many houses were damaged, especially in the Poll area (which sustained IF2 damage).

=== December 22 (Poland) ===
A low-topped supercell thunderstorm spawned a tornado in Grochowy, Wielkopolskie, Poland. Several houses had roof damage, and high-voltage power lines were brought down. The European Severe Storms Laboratory rated the tornado IF2 due to the collapsed power-transmission line.

=== December 25 (Australia) ===
A tornado was confirmed by the Bureau of Meteorology on the Gold Coast. Significant damage occurred in the Wongawallan area, where a number of houses had their roofs torn off; two also had some loss of exterior walls. Trees and concrete power poles were snapped.

=== December 27 (United Kingdom) ===
A supercell thunderstorm generated by Storm Gerrit struck the town of Stalybridge in Tameside, Greater Manchester. The Met Office reported that the storm had a strong rotating updraft on its Doppler radar, strongly suggesting a tornado. The area impacted by the tornado sustained moderate-to-severe damage. One hundred houses were damaged; windows were smashed, chimney pots toppled and roofs were torn up by high winds, with debris strewn across roads. A TORRO site investigator surveyed the area and confirmed the tornado, rating it T5 (high-end F2) on the TORRO scale. The European Severe Storms Laboratory rated the tornado IF2.

== Tornadic research ==
In January 2023, the 2023 Pasadena–Deer Park tornado prompts the National Weather Service forecasting office in Houston to issue a rare tornado emergency, the first ever issued by the office. In April, the TORNADO Act was introduced by U.S. Senator Roger Wicker as well as eight other senators from the 118th United States Congress. In July, the International Fujita scale (IF-scale) is officially published. In September, the National Weather Service offices in Jackson, Mississippi, and Nashville, Tennessee, along with the National Severe Storms Laboratory (NSSL) and the University of Oklahoma's CIWRO publish a joint damage survey and analysis on the 2023 Rolling Fork–Silver City EF4 tornado, the 2023 Black Hawk–Winona EF3 tornado, and the 2023 New Wren–Amory EF3 tornado. In November, American meteorologist and tornado expert Thomas P. Grazulis publishes Significant Tornadoes 1974–2022, which includes the outbreak intensity score (OIS), a new way to classify and rank tornado outbreaks. Between December 2023 – April 2024, the Detecting and Evaluating Low-level Tornado Attributes (DELTA) project, led by NOAA, along with the National Severe Storms Laboratory and several research universities, occurred.

== See also ==
- Weather of 2023
- Tornado
  - List of tornado events by year
  - Tornado records
  - Tornado climatology
  - Tornado myths
- Lists of tornadoes and tornado outbreaks
  - List of F5 and EF5 tornadoes
  - List of F4 and EF4 tornadoes
    - List of F4 and EF4 tornadoes (2020–present)
  - List of F3, EF3, and IF3 tornadoes (2020–present)
  - List of North American tornadoes and tornado outbreaks
  - List of Canadian tornadoes and tornado outbreaks (since 2001)
  - List of European tornadoes and tornado outbreaks
  - List of tornadoes and tornado outbreaks in Asia
  - Tornado climatology
  - List of tornadoes striking downtown areas of large cities
  - Satellite tornado
- List of case studies on tornadoes (2020–present)
- Tornado intensity
  - Fujita scale
  - Enhanced Fujita scale
  - International Fujita scale
    - List of tornadoes rated on the 2018 International Fujita scale
  - TORRO scale
