= Turkish name =

A Turkish name consists of an ad or an isim (given name; plural adlar and isimler) and a soyadı or soyisim (surname). Turkish names exist in a "full name" format. While there is only one soyadı (surname) in the full name there may be more than one ad (given name). Married women may carry both their maiden and husband's surnames. The soyadı is written as the last element of the full name, after all given names (except that official documents related to registration matters often use the format "Soyadı, Adı").

== Given names ==
At least one name, often two but very rarely more, are given to a person at birth. Newly given names are allowed up to three words. Most names are gender-specific: Oğuz is strictly for males, Tuğçe only for females. But many Turkish names are unisex. Many modern given names (such as Deniz, "sea"; or Ülkü, "ideal") are given to newborns of either sex.

Among the common examples of the many unisex names in Turkey include Aytaç, Deniz, Derya, Evren, Evrim, Özgür, and Yücel. Unlike English unisex names, most Turkish unisex names have been traditionally used for both genders. However, some unisex names are used more for one gender (Derya is used more for girls, whereas Aytaç is used more for boys). Names are given to babies by their parents and then registered in "The Central Civil Registration System" (MERNIS) while preparing the baby's identity document at the birth registration office of the district's governorship.

Turkish names are often words with specific meanings in the Turkish language.

Most Turkish names can easily be differentiated from others, except those of other Turkic nations, particularly Azerbaijan (see Azerbaijani name), especially if they are of pure Turkic origin such as Ersen. The Law on the Adoption and Implementation of the Turkish Alphabet of 1928, in force as decreed by article 174 of the Constitution of Turkey, prescribes that only letters in the Turkish alphabet may be used on birth certificates. As the Turkish alphabet has no Q, W, X, or other symbols, names including those cannot be officially given unless they are transliterated into Turkish.

Ideological concerns of the families can also affect naming behaviour. Some religious families give first or second names of Arabic origin, which can be names of important figures in the religion of Islam such as Muhammed and Ali. The Arabic-origin names may also be adjectives such as Münci and Mebrure. Some of these names have evolved in time, differentiating from the Arabic original, as in the case of Mehmet (although the original name [Muhammed] also began to be used after the switch to the Latin alphabet distinguished the two spellings). Another change is for linguistic reasons such as in the case of Vahdettin (from Vahideddin), Sadettin (from Sa'adeddin), or Nurettin (from Nureddin).

Some Turkish people with multiple given names are commonly referred to with just one of these names, while others are referred to with both. For example, the writer Ferit Orhan Pamuk is commonly known simply as Orhan Pamuk, but another writer, Ahmet Hamdi Tanpınar, is known with both given names. Many Turkish people with more than one given name, like Orhan Pamuk, are often known and called by the name preceding their surname, as opposed to Western naming conventions. Turkish spells two-part names separately, which is different from some other Turkic languages, like Tatar (Möxəmmətğayaz: Muhammed Ayaz). Thus, "Ayaz” in a name like Muhammed Ayaz İshaki is not exactly a middle name as usually understood in European context.

Some of the given names from earlier periods are still in use such as Öner and Rasih.

== Surnames ==
Until the introduction of the Surname Law in 1934, as part of Atatürk's Reforms, ethnic Turks who were Turkish citizens had no surnames. The law required all citizens of Turkey to adopt an official surname. Before then, male Turks often used their father's name followed by -oğlu ("son of"), or a nickname of the family, before their given name (e.g. Mustafa-oğlu Mehmet, Köselerin Hasan). The Turks who descended from a ruling house used -zade ("descendant in the male line"), e.g. Sami Paşazade Mehmet Bey ("Mehmet Bey, descendant/son of Sami Pasha").

The surname (soyad, literally "lineage name" or "family name") is an ancestry-based name following a person's given names, used for addressing people or the family. The surname (soyadı) is a single word according to Turkish law such as Akay or Özdemir. It is not gender-specific and has no gender-dependent modifications. The soyadı is neither patronymic nor matronymic. Surnames in Turkey are patrilineal: they pass in the male line from father to his legal children without any change in form. Turkey has abolished all notions of nobility; thus, there is no noble form or type of surname.

Since 2014, women in Turkey are allowed to keep their birth names alone for their whole life instead of using their husbands' names. Before this date, the Turkish Code of Civil Law Article 187 required a married woman to compulsorily obtain her husband's surname after the marriage; or otherwise, to use her birth name in front of her husband's name by giving a written application to the marriage officer or the civil registry office. In 2014, the Constitutional Court ruled that prohibiting married women from retaining only maiden names is a violation of their rights. After divorce, the woman returns to her pre-marriage surname. The court may grant a woman the right to keep her ex-husband's surname after divorcing; the court's decision must consider both the man's and the woman's situations. A woman may have only two surnames due to marriage. Thus, a woman who continues to use a double surname after divorcing, cannot take a third surname by marrying again. The child of a family takes the "family name", which is his or her father's surname. A child takes their mother's surname if the mother is not married, or if the father is unknown.

Turkish citizens may change their surnames according to Turkish Civil Law and Turkish Law on Population Services via court decision of "civil court of first instance".

== Most common names ==
=== Male ===
Year	No. 1	No. 2	No. 3	No. 4	No. 5	No. 6	No. 7	No. 8	No. 9	No. 10
Babies born, 2013	Yusuf	Berat	Mustafa	Emir	Ahmet	Ömer	Mehmet	Muhammed	Emirhan	Eymen
Overall, 2013	Mehmet	Mustafa	Ahmet	Ali	Hüseyin	Hasan	İbrahim	İsmail	Osman	Yusuf
Babies born, 2024	Alparslan	Göktuğ	Yusuf	Metehan	Ömer Asaf	Kerem	Aslan	Ömer	Miraç	Eymen

=== Female ===
Year	No. 1	No. 2	No. 3	No. 4	No. 5	No. 6	No. 7	No. 8	No. 9	No. 10
Babies born, 2013	Zeynep	Elif	Ecrin	Yağmur	Azra	Zehra	Nisanur	Ela	Belinay	Nehir
Overall, 2013	Fatma	Ayşe	Emine	Hatice	Zeynep	Elif	Meryem	Şerife	Zehra	Sultan
Babies born, 2024	Defne	Asel	Zeynep	Asya	Gökçe	Zümra	Elif	Elisa	Lina	Duru

=== Surnames ===
Year	No. 1	No. 2	No. 3	No. 4	No. 5	No. 6	No. 7	No. 8	No. 9	No. 10
Overall, 2013	Yılmaz	Kaya	Demir	Şahin	Çelik	Yıldız	Yıldırım	Öztürk	Aydın	Özdemir

== See also ==
- Azerbaijani name
