= Qılınclı =

Qılınclı or Qilincli or Gilinjli or Kilichli or Kylychly may refer to:

- Qılınclı, Kalbajar, a village in the Kalbajar District of Azerbaijan
- Qılınclı, Lachin, a village in the Lachin District of Azerbaijan

== See also ==
- Qılıçlı (disambiguation)
- Kılıçlı (disambiguation)
