= Elif (name) =

Elif (Turkish pronunciation: [elif]) is a name that is most commonly given to females in Turkey, but is also popular in other countries such as the Netherlands. In Greece, it is associated with the name Nefeli. It originates from the Arabic word for the first letter of the Ottoman Turkish alphabet. Like the shape of the letter, it is thus taken to mean 'slender or upright'.

== Given name ==
Notable Turkish people (unless otherwise mentioned) with this name include:

- Begünhan Elif Ünsal (born 1993), Turkish archer
- Elif Ağca Yarar (born 1984), Turkish retired volleyball player
- Ayliva (real name Elif Akar, born 1998), German singer and musician
- Elif Altınkaynak (born 1974), Turkish archer
- Elif Sıla Aydın (born 1996), Turkish handball player
- Elif Batuman (born 1977), American author, academic, journalist
- Elif Bayram (born 2001), Turkish basketball player
- Elif Berra Gökkır (born 2007), Turkish archer
- Elif Beyza Aşık (born 1994), Turkish sports shooter
- Elif Celep (born 1994), Turkish gymnast
- Elif Ceren Çolak (born 2005), Turkish trampoline gymnast
- Elif Çomoğlu Ülgen (born 1971), Turkish diplomat
- Elif Demirezer (born 1992), German-Turkish pop singer and songwriter
- Elif Deniz (born 1993), Turkish footballer
- Elif Doğan (born 1994), Turkish actress
- Elif Doğan Türkmen (born 1962), Turkish politician
- Elif Ekşi (born 1967), Turkish archer
- İlayda Elif Elhih, Turkish actress
- Elif Elmas (born 1999), Macedonian footballer from North Macedonia
- Elif Eralp (born 1981), German politician
- Elif Gülbayrak (born 1988), Turkish volleyball player
- Elif Gülşen (born 1998), Turkish judoka
- Elif Güneri (born 1987), Turkish boxer
- Elif Keskin (born 2002), Turkish women's footballer
- Elif Kızılkaya (born 1991), Turkish curler
- Elif Köroğlu, Turkish football referee
- Elif Naci (1898–1987), Turkish journalist, painter, writer and curator
- Elif Polat (born 1999), Turkish sprinter
- Elif Nur Turhan (born 1995), Turkish boxer
- Elif Shafak (born 1971), Turkish-British writer and activist
- Elif Şahin (born 2001), Turkish volleyball player
- Elif Sözen-Kohl (born 1969), Turkish banker
- Elif Ulaş (born 1986), Turkish figure skater amd ice hockey player
- Elif Su İltaş (born 2011), Turkish arm wrestler
- Elif Uysal, Turkish electrical engineer
- Elif Jale Yeşilırmak (born 1986), Turkish wrestler of Russian origin
- Elif Yıldırım (born 1990), Turkish middle-distance runner

== Middle name ==
- Eylem Elif Maviş (born 1973), Turkish mountaineer

== See also ==
- Aleph – First letter of many Semitic abjads
- Alpha (name)
- Elif (disambiguation)
