= Azal =

Azal may refer to:

- Atif Azal, known as A-Zal, a New-York-based musician
- Azal Branco, a white Portuguese wine grape
- Azal Tinto, a red Portuguese wine grape
- Azal (Bible), a location mentioned in the Book of Zechariah
- Azerbaijan Airlines, also known as AZAL
  - Buta Airways, formerly AZALJet, a subsidiary of Azerbaijan Airlines
