= Köroğlu =

Köroğlu is a Turkish name, and it may refer to:

== Myth ==
- Epic of Koroghlu, heroic legend prominent in the oral traditions of the Turkic peoples
- Köroğlu, semi-mystical hero and bard among the Turkic people

== Given name ==
- Koroglu Rahimov (1953–1992), national hero of Azerbaijan

== Surname ==
- Abdülkadir Köroğlu (born 1991), Turkish amateur boxer
- Elif Köroğlu, Turkish female football referee
- Hüseyin Köroğlu (born 1964), Turkish Cypriot actor

== Places ==
- Köroğlu Mountains, mountain range situated in the northern Turkey, north of Ankara
- Köroğlu, Şenkaya
- Köroğlu, Zonguldak, a village in Zonguldak District, Zonguldak Province, Turkey
