= Deniz =

Deniz may refer to:

- Deniz (given name), Turkish given name
- Deniz (surname), surname both of Spanish-Portuguese and Turkish origins
