= Qılıçlı =

Qılıçlı or Klychly may refer to:

- Qılıçlı, Kalbajar, Azerbaijan
- Qılıçlı, Lachin, Azerbaijan

== See also ==
- Qılınclı (disambiguation)
- Kılıçlı (disambiguation)
