= Özyiğit =

Özyiğit is a Turkish surname. Notable people with the surname include:

- Arzu Özyiğit (born 1972), Turkish basketball player and sports executive
- Evren Özyiğit (born 1986), Turkish footballer
