= Asal =

Asal may refer to:

- Association for the Study of Australian Literature
- Algerian Space Agency
- Asal (film), a 2010 Indian Tamil-language film starring Ajith Kumar
  - Aasal (soundtrack), the soundtrack album from that film
- Asal, Yemen, a village in western central Yemen
- Asal, King of the Golden Pillars, a figure in Irish Celtic mythology
- Asal (grape), a Portuguese wine grape
- Mostafa Asal (born 2001), Egyptian squash player
- Asal (given name), the given name
