= Demircili =

Demircili may refer to

- Demircili, Ağaçören, a village in Akasaray Province, Turkey
- Demircili, Emirdağ, a village in Ankara Province, Turkey
- Demircili, Silifke, a village in Mersin Province, Turkey
