= Kütüklü =

Kütüklü (literally "(place) with logs") is a Turkish place name that may refer to the following places in Turkey:

- Kütüklü, Ağaçören, a village in the district of Ağaçören, Aksaray Province
- Kütüklü, Beşiri, a village in the district of Beşiri, Batman Province
- Kütüklü, Gerger, a village in the district of Gerger, Adıyaman Province
- Kütüklü, Yüreğir, a village in the district of Yüreğir, Adana Province
