= Abalı =

Abalı may refer to:

- Abalı, Ağaçören, a village in the district of Ağaçören, Aksaray Province, Turkey
- Abalı, Lice
- Abalı, Zaqatala, a village in the municipality of Maqov, Zaqatala Rayon, Azerbaijan
