= Sarıağıl =

Sarıağıl can refer to:

- Sarıağıl, Ağaçören
- Sarıağıl, Beypazarı
- Sarıağıl, İznik
