= Akay (name) =

Akay is a Turkish-origin surname and a masculine given name. In Turkish it refers to full moon or the fourteenth of the month. Notable people with the name include:

== Surname ==
- Büşra Akay (born 2005), Turkish female sprinter
- Derya Akay (born 1988), Turkish-Canadian artist
- Ezel Akay (born 1961), Turkish film director
- Mert Akay (born 2000), Turkish basketball player
- Miray Akay (born 2000), Ukrainian-Turkish actress
- Sezgi Sena Akay (born 1994), Turkish actress
- Şenay Akay (born 1980), Turkish actress and model
- Taju Akay (1972–2006), Ghanaian-British boxer

== Given name ==
- Akay, Swedish graffiti artist

== Other uses ==
- Akay National Political Party
