= Camili, Ağaçören =

Camili
- Neighbourhood
- Country: Turkey
- Province: Aksaray
- District: Ağaçören
- Municipality: Ağaçören
- Population (2021): 997
- Time zone: UTC+3 (TRT)

Camili is a neighbourhood of the town Ağaçören, Ağaçören District, Aksaray Province, Turkey. Its population is 997 (2021). Before the 2013 reorganisation, it was a town (belde).
