= Deniz (given name) =

- Gender: Unisex
- Language: Turkish

Origin
- Derivation: Deniz
- Meaning: Sea

Deniz is a unisex Turkish given name meaning "sea". It is used for both women and men. Deniz is the 63rd most popular name among males and the 69th most popular name among females. It is the most popular unisex name in Turkey. It is etymologically unrelated to Dennis.

Originally, Deniz was a masculine name. In a Turkish legend (Oğuz Kağan epic), the oldest Turkish ruler (Khan) Oğuz had six sons. They were Ay-Han (moon Khan), Gök-Han (sky Khan), Deniz-Han (sea Khan), Yıldız-Han (star Khan), Gün-Han (sun Khan) and Dağ-Han (mountain Khan).

== First name ==
- Deniz Aslan (born 1989), Turkish footballer
- Deniz Aycicek (born 1990), Turkish-German footballer
- Deniz Aydoğdu (born 1983), Turkish footballer
- Deniz Aytekin (born 1978), German football referee of Turkish descent
- Deniz Barış (born 1977), Turkish footballer
- Deniz Baykal (1938–2023), Turkish politician
- Deniz Baykara (born 1984), Turkish footballer
- Deniz Bozkurt (born 1993), Turkish-Puerto Rican footballer
- Deniz Burnham (born 1985), American Astronaut
- Deniz Çakır (born 1982), Turkish film and television actress
- Deniz Çınar (born 1984), Turkish yacht racer
- Deniz Dimaki (born 1977), Greek triathlete
- Deniz Doğan (born 1979), German footballer
- Deniz Ertan (born 2004), Turkish swimmer
- Deniz Gezmiş (1947–1972), Turkish political activist
- Deniz Hakyemez (born 1983), Turkish volleyball player
- Deniz Hümmet (born 1996), Turkish footballer
- Deniz Kadah (born 1986), Turkish footballer
- Deniz Kandiyoti (born 1944), Turkish feminist academic
- Deniz Khazaniuk (born 1994), Israeli tennis player
- Deniz Kılıçlı (born 1990), Turkish basketballer
- Deniz Koyu (born 1985), Turkish-German DJ and electronic dance music producer
- Deniz Kurku (born 1982), German politician
- Deniz Kurtel, Turkish artist and electronic musician
- Deniz Kuypers, Dutch-American writer
- Deniz Mujić (born 1990), Austrian footballer of Bosnian descent
- Deniz Naki (born 1989), German footballer
- Deniz Nazar (born 1980), Ukrainian-born Turkish swimmer
- Deniz Orhun (born 1974), Turkish-American chef, media personality and businesswoman
- Deniz Öncü (born 2003), Turkish motorcycle racer
- Deniz Özer (born 1987), Turkish-German footballer
- Deniz Seki (born 1970), Turkish pop singer
- Deniz Tek (born 1952), Australian rock musician of Turkish descent
- Deniz Türüç (born 1993), Dutch-Turkish footballer
- Deniz Undav (born 1996), German footballer
- Deniz Uyanık (born 2001), Turkish female volleyball player
- Deniz Yılmaz (born 1988), Turkish footballer
- Deniz Yücel (born 1973), German-Turkish journalist

=== Middle name ===
- Damla Deniz Düz (born 1995), Turkish water polo player
- Dilan Deniz Gökçek (born 1976), Turkish football referee
- Nazlı Deniz Kuruoğlu (born 1960), Turkish ballet dancer and former beauty contestant

=== Last name ===
- Dilan Çiçek Deniz (born 1995), Turkish actress, model and beauty pageant titleholder who was crowned Miss Universe Turkey 2014

== Fictional characters ==
- Deniz, in Follow Kadri, Not Your Heart
- Deniz Skinner, in Lazarus

== See also ==
- Deniz (surname), for notable people with this surname
- Denis of Portugal
- Denise (given name), pronounced similarly in French
