= Minho wine region =

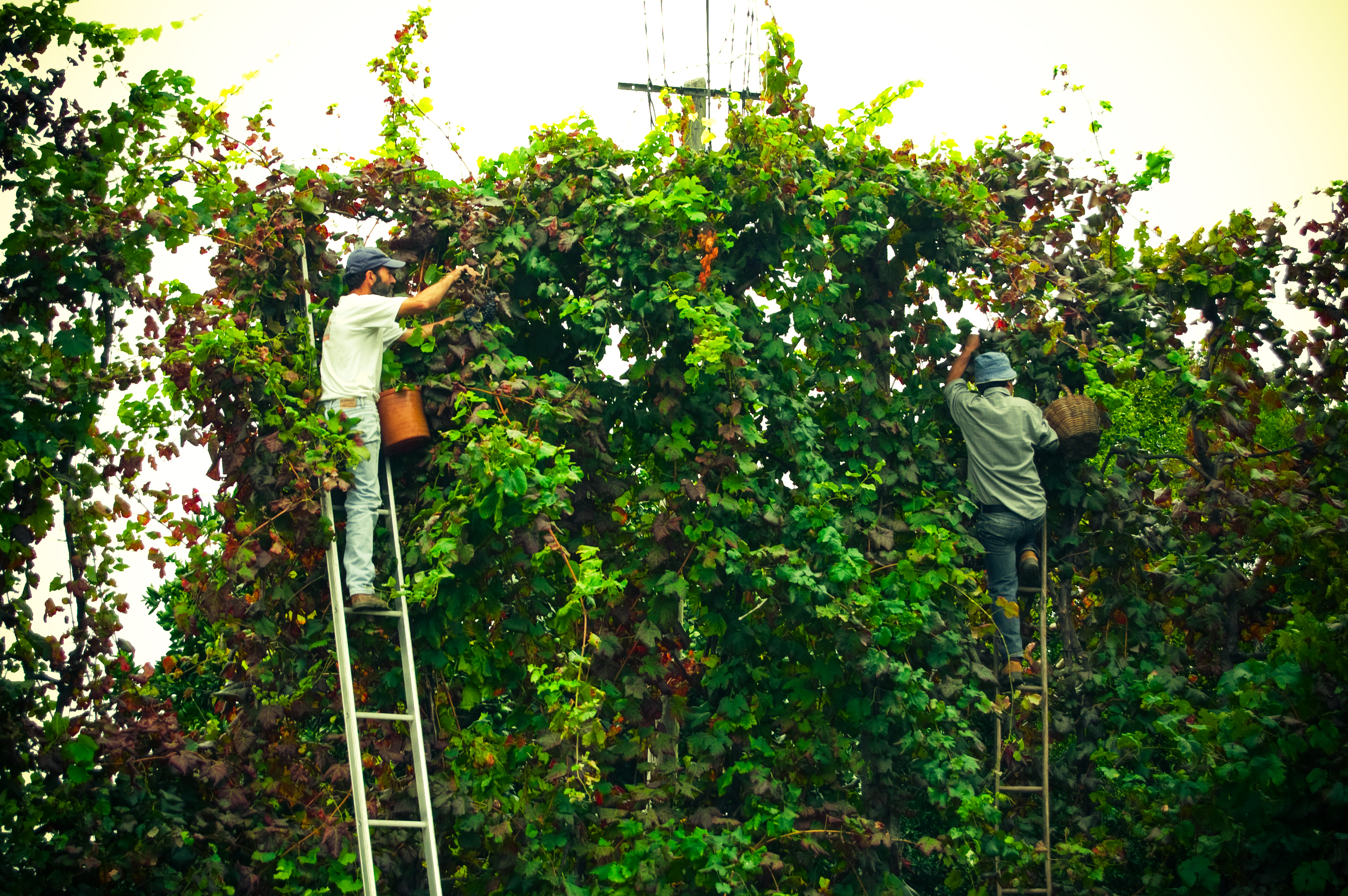
Harvest in Guimarães in the Minho wine region.

Minho, formerly Rios do Minho, is a Portuguese wine region covering the same areas as the Vinho Verde DOC. The region is classified as a Vinho Regional (VR), a designation similar to a French vin de pays region. The wines of the Minho and Vinho Verde are nearly identical except for the Minho VR allowing foreign grape varieties to be used that are excluded from the Denominação de Origem Controlada (DOC) regulations for Vinho Verde.

== Grapes ==
The principal grapes of the Minho region include Alvarinho, Arinto, Avesso, Azal Branco, Azal Tinto, Batoca, Borracal, Brancelho, Cabernet Sauvignon, Chardonnay, Espadeiro, Loureiro, Merlot, Padreiro de Basto, Pedral, Rabo de Ovelha, Riesling, Trajadura and Vinhão.

== See also ==
- List of Portuguese wine regions
