= Tuğçe =

- Gender: Female
- Language: Turkish

Origin
- Language: Turkish

Tuğçe (pronounced [ˈtuːtʃe]) is a common feminine Turkish given name. The name is a diminutive of tuğ "kind of crown that is worn by Turkish kings in ancient ages", a type of rank insignia or field ensign used in the Ottoman army.

== People ==
=== Given name ===
- Tuğçe Albayrak (1991–2014), German-Turkish victim of violence, see Death of Tuğçe Albayrak
- Tuğçe Beder (born 1999), Turkish judoka
- Tuğçe Canıtez (born 1990), Turkish basketball player
- Tuğçe Duyuş (born 1995), Turkish karateka
- Tuğçe Hocaoğlu (born 1988), Turkish volleyball player
- Tuğçe İnöntepe (born 1987), Turkish basketball player
- Tuğçe Kazaz (born 1982), Turkish model and Miss Turkey 2001
- Tuğçe Murat (born 1991), Turkish basketball player
- Tuğçe Özbudak (born 1982), Turkish actress
- Tuğçe San (born 1971), Turkish singer and musician
- Tuğçe Şahutoğlu (born 1988), Turkish hammer thrower
