= Carvalhal =

Carvalhal may refer to:

== Civil parishes in Portugal ==
- Carvalhal (Abrantes), in the municipality of Abrantes
- Carvalhal (Barcelos), in the municipality of Barcelos
- Carvalhal (Mêda), in the municipality of Mêda
- Carvalhal (Grândola), in the municipality of Grândola

== Grapes ==
- Carvalhal (grape), another name for the Portuguese wine grape Azal Branco

== People ==
- Alberto Carvalhal (born 1953), Portuguese sailor and football attacking midfielder
- Carlos Carvalhal (born 1965), Portuguese football coach
