= Güzelöz =

Güzelöz may refer to:

- Güzelöz, Ağaçören, village in Aksaray Province, Turkey
- Güzelöz, Nallıhan, village in Ankara Province, Turkey
- Güzelöz, Gercüş, in Batman Province, Turkey
- Güzelöz, Yeşilhisar aka Mavrucan, in Yeşilhisar Province, Turkey
