= Evren =

Evren is a Turkish word, gender-neutral name, and surname meaning universe or cosmos. It may refer to:

== Mythology ==
- A dragon in Turkic mythology

== People ==
=== Given name ===
- Evren Büker (born 1985), Turkish basketball player
- Evren Cagiran (born 1993), Turkish compound archer
- Evren Celimli (born 1971), American composer
- Evren Eren Elmalı (born 2000), Turkish footballer
- Evren Erdeniz (born 1983), Turkish footballer
- Evren Korkmaz (born 1997), Turkish footballer
- Evren Ozdemir (born 1977), Turkish-Canadian musical artist
- Evren Özyiğit (born 1986), Turkish footballer

=== Surname ===
- Agnès Evren (born 1970), French politician
- Ahi Evren (1169–1261), Turkish Muslim preacher
- Burçak Evren (born 1947), Turkish film historian, author, journalist, researcher, and film critic
- Kenan Evren (1917–2015), seventh President of Turkey
- Sekine Evren (1922–1982), seventh First Lady of Turkey
- Süreyya Evren (born 1972), Turkish anarchist

== Places ==
- Evren, Ankara, a town and district of Ankara Province
- Evren, Mut, a village in Mut district of Mersin Province
