= Çatalçeşme, Ağaçören =

Çatalçeşme
- Village
- Location within Turkey Location within Turkey Central Anatolia
- Coordinates: 38.7565°N 33.9343°E
- Country: Turkey
- Province: Aksaray
- District: Ağaçören
- Population (2021): 88
- Time zone: UTC+3 (TRT)

Çatalçeşme is a village in the Ağaçören District, Aksaray Province, Turkey.

== Census ==
Its population is 88 (2021).
