= Karadere, Zonguldak =

Karadere
- Village
- Location within Turkey
- Country: Turkey
- Province: Zonguldak
- District: Zonguldak
- Population (2022): 398
- Time zone: UTC+3 (TRT)

Karadere is a village in Zonguldak District, Zonguldak Province, Turkey. Its population is 398 (2022).
