= Kırımini, Ağaçören =

Kırımini
- Village
- Location within Turkey Location within Turkey Central Anatolia
- Coordinates: 38°46′N 33°47′E
- Country: Turkey
- Province: Aksaray
- District: Ağaçören
- Population (2021): 282
- Time zone: UTC+3 (TRT)

Kırımini is a village in the Ağaçören District, Aksaray Province, Turkey. Its population is 282 (2021).
