= Hacıismailli, Ağaçören =

Hacıismailli
- Village
- Location within Turkey Location within Turkey Central Anatolia
- Coordinates: 38°48′N 33°55′E
- Country: Turkey
- Province: Aksaray
- District: Ağaçören
- Population (2021): 109
- Time zone: UTC+3 (TRT)

Hacıismailli is a village in the Ağaçören District, Aksaray Province, Turkey. Its population is 109 (2021).
