= Espadeiro =

Variety of grape

- Grape (Vitis)
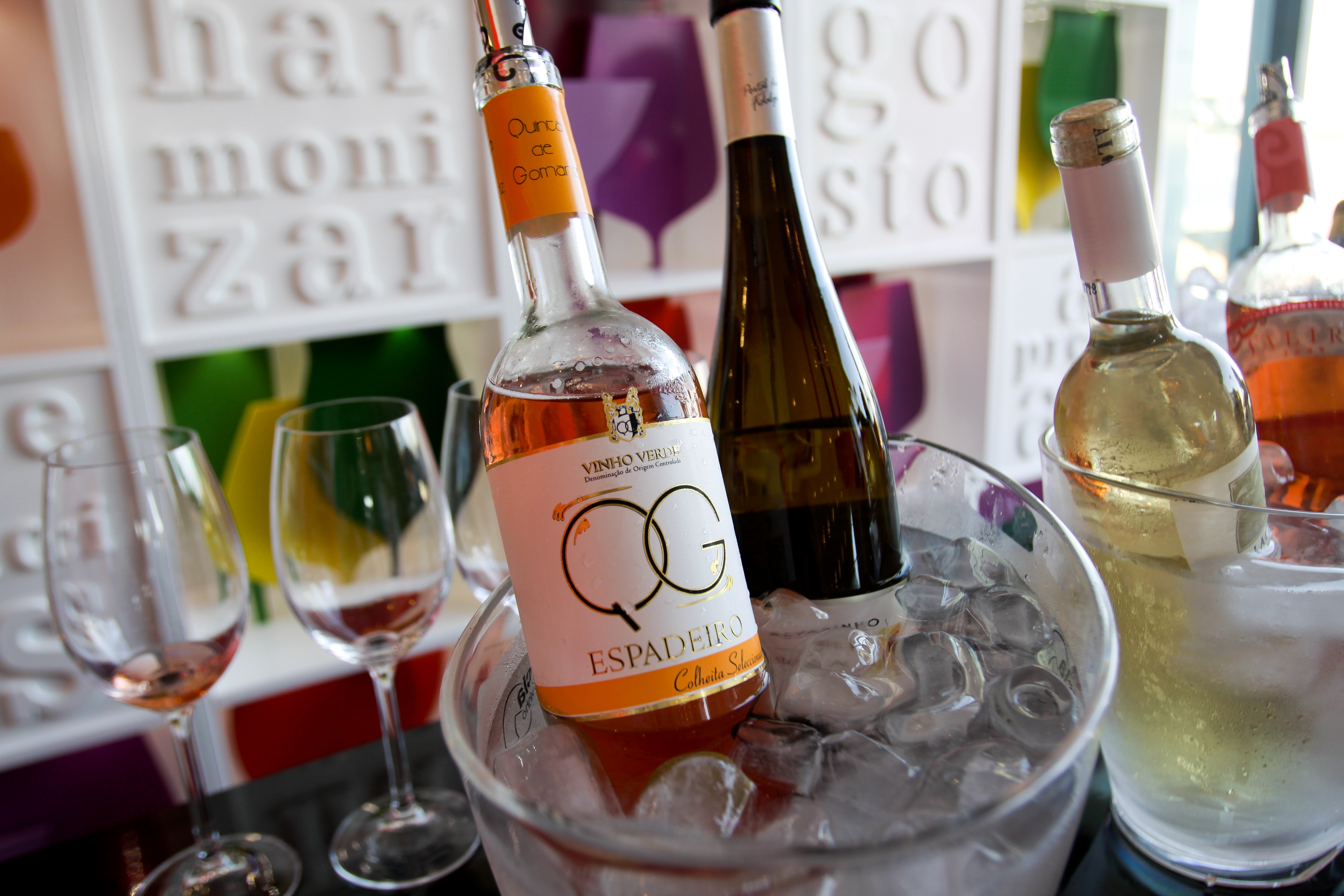
- Red Vinho Verde made from Espadeiro
- Color of berry skin: Noir
- Species: Vitis vinifera
- Origin: Portugal
- VIVC number: 13100

Espadeiro is a red Portuguese wine grape planted primarily in the Minho region for making Vinho Verde. It is also grown across the border, in Galicia (Spain) where it is used to make light bodied wines.

Rather than being a single grape variety, there are several variants in the Espadeiro family of grapes, including Espadeiro tinto and Espadeiro Mole, with partially overlapping synonyms.

== See also ==
- List of Portuguese wine grape varieties
