= Sofular, Ağaçören =

Sofular
- Village
- Location within Turkey Location within Turkey Central Anatolia
- Coordinates: 38.765°N 33.839°E
- Country: Turkey
- Province: Aksaray
- District: Ağaçören
- Population (2021): 154
- Time zone: UTC+3 (TRT)

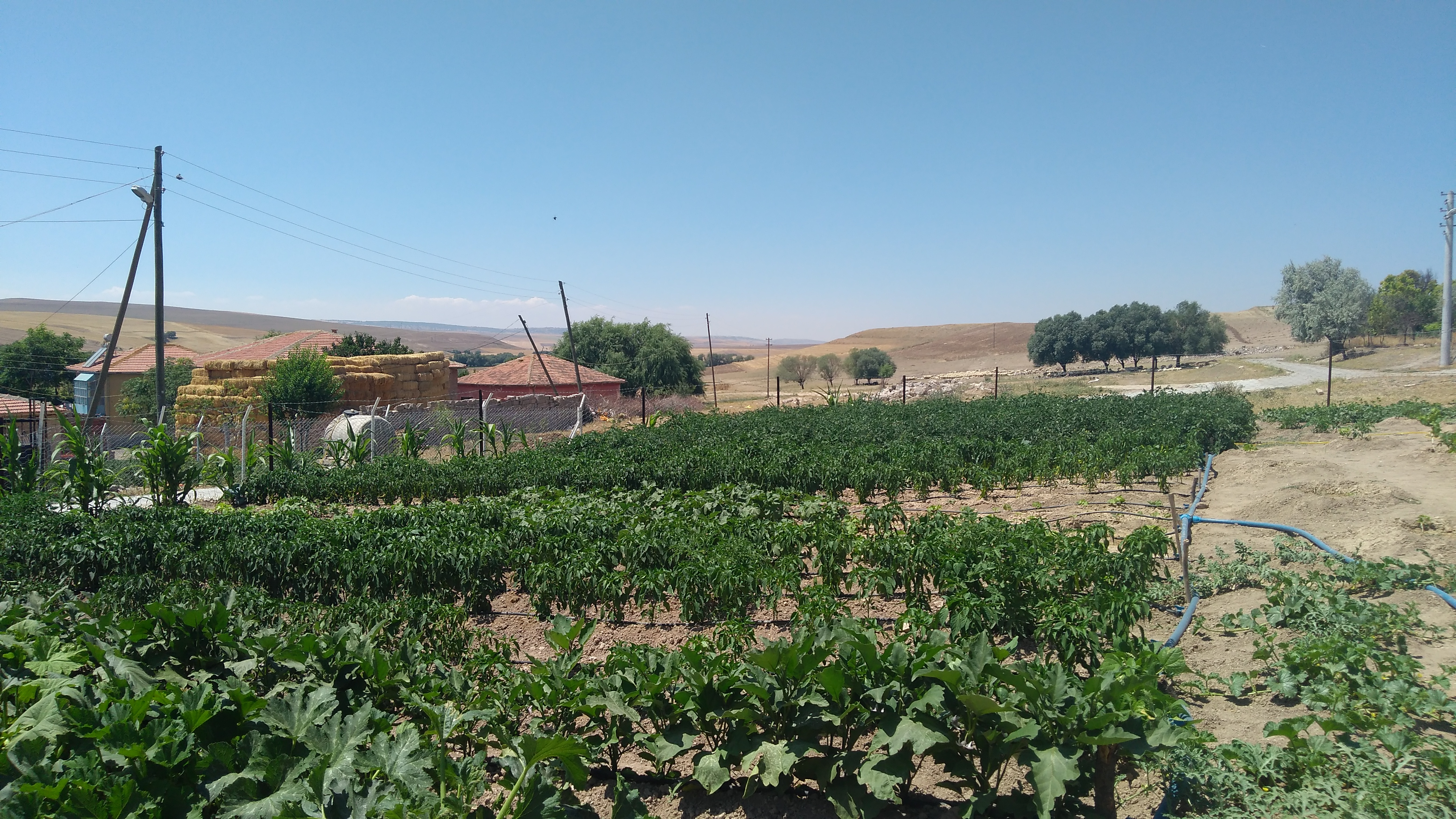
Sofular

Sofular is a village in the Ağaçören District, Aksaray Province, Turkey. Its population is 154 (2021).
