= Göllü, Ağaçören =

Göllü
- Village
- Location within Turkey Location within Turkey Central Anatolia
- Country: Turkey
- Province: Aksaray
- District: Ağaçören
- Population (2021): 200
- Time zone: UTC+3 (TRT)

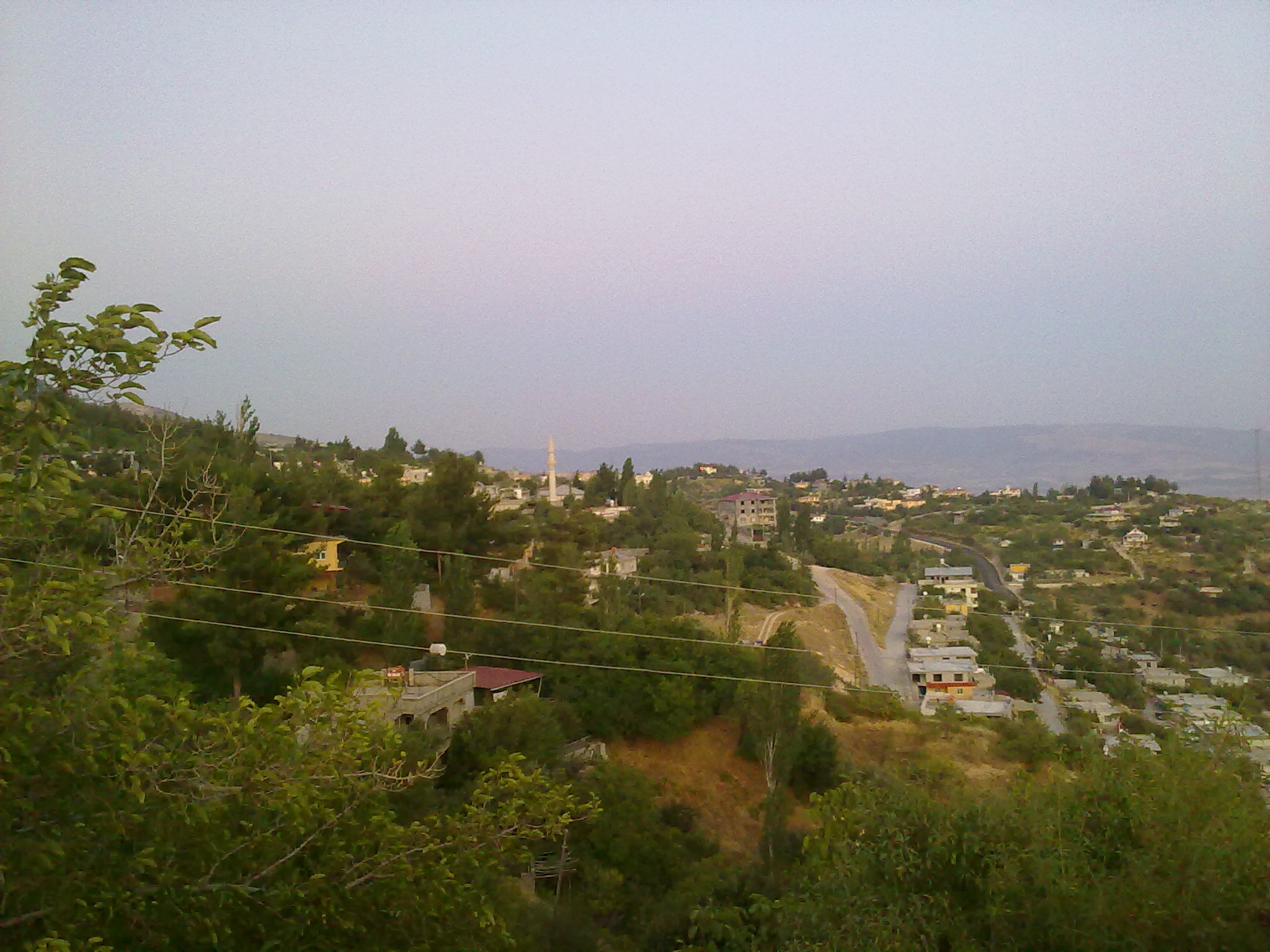

Göllü is a village in the Ağaçören District, Aksaray Province, Turkey. Its population is 200 (2021).
