= Kumtarla, Zonguldak =

Kumtarla
- Village
- Location within Turkey
- Coordinates: 41°21′N 31°52′E
- Country: Turkey
- Province: Zonguldak
- District: Zonguldak
- Population (2022): 357
- Time zone: UTC+3 (TRT)

Kumtarla is a village in Zonguldak District, Zonguldak Province, Turkey. Its population is 357 (2022).
