= Yağmurhüyüğü, Ağaçören =

Yağmurhüyüğü
- Village
- Location within Turkey Location within Turkey Central Anatolia
- Coordinates: 38°45′N 33°53′E
- Country: Turkey
- Province: Aksaray
- District: Ağaçören
- Population (2021): 157
- Time zone: UTC+3 (TRT)

Yağmurhüyüğü is a village in the Ağaçören District, Aksaray Province, Turkey. Its population is 157 (2021).
