= Avşar, Ağaçören =

Avşar
- Village
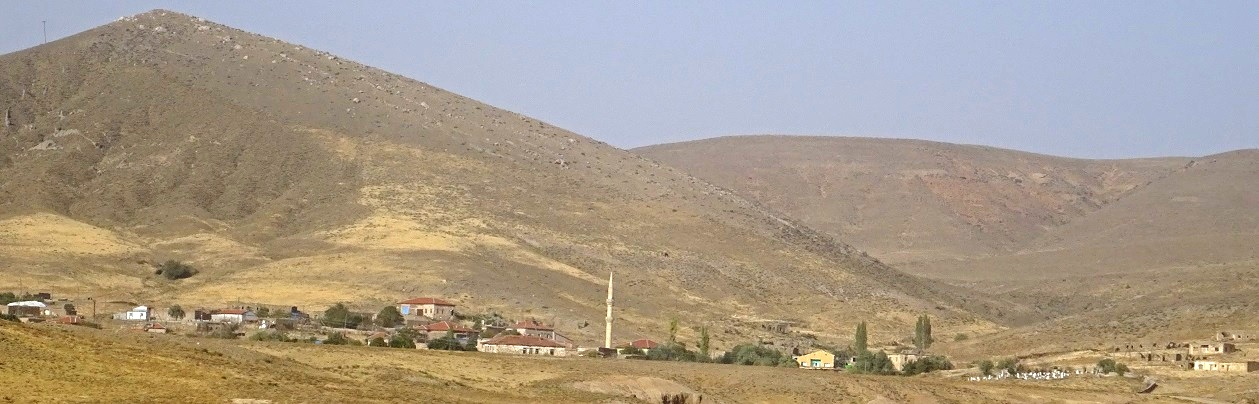
- A view from the village

- Location within Turkey Location within Turkey Central Anatolia
- Coordinates: 38.7517°N 33.7764°E
- Country: Turkey
- Province: Aksaray
- District: Ağaçören
- Elevation: 1,276 m (4,186 ft)
- Population (2021): 184
- Time zone: UTC+3 (TRT)

Avşar is a village in the Ağaçören District, Aksaray Province, Turkey. Its population is 184 (2021).
