= Kaleoğlu, Zonguldak =

Kaleoğlu
- Village
- Location within Turkey
- Coordinates: 41°19′N 32°01′E
- Country: Turkey
- Province: Zonguldak
- District: Zonguldak
- Population (2022): 474
- Time zone: UTC+3 (TRT)

Kaleoğlu is a village in Zonguldak District, Zonguldak Province, Turkey. Its population is 474 (2022).
