= Emirhan =

Emirhan may refer to:

== People ==
- Emirhan Aydoğan (born 1997), Turkish footballer
- Emirhan Civelek (born 2000), Turkish footballer
- Emirhan Delibaş (born 2003), Turkish footballer
- Emirhan Ergün (born 1990), Turkish footballer
- Emirhan İlkhan (born 2004), Turkish footballer
- Emirhan Kaşcıoğlu (born 2001), Turkish footballer
- Emirhan Sarımustafaoğlu (born 2010), Turkish skateboarder
- Emirhan Topçu (born 2000), Turkish footballer

== Places ==
- Emirhan, Baskil, village in Turkey
- Emirhan, Zara, village in Turkey
