= Yenice, Ağaçören =

Yenice
- Village
- Location within Turkey Location within Turkey Central Anatolia
- Coordinates: 38.7533°N 33.9154°E
- Country: Turkey
- Province: Aksaray
- District: Ağaçören
- Population (2021): 104
- Time zone: UTC+3 (TRT)

Yenice is a village in the Ağaçören District, Aksaray Province, Turkey. Its population is 104 (2021).
