= Deniz (surname) =

Déniz or Deniz (also written Denis in some parts of South America, see Denis) is a Spanish-Portuguese surname derived from the French surname De Niz. Deniz, although of different origin, is also a Turkish name.

People with Déniz surnames of Spanish-Portuguese origin can be found mostly in the Canary Islands, Azores, Madeira and in the Americas (USA, Cuba, etc.).

De Niz in French, Spanish and Portuguese means "from Niz", where Niz is a defunct spelling variation of the name of the French city Nice. De Nice was written Déniz in Spanish and Portuguese. People bearing that surname in Spain and Portugal and their descendants have the surname with French roots. Alternatively, the Portuguese surname deNiz means "from the be-giN'ing", intricately related with the End.

Deniz can refer to the following people:

- Atiye Deniz (born 1988), Turkish singer
- Burak Deniz (born 1991), Turkish actor
- Derviş Kemal Deniz (born 1954), Turkish-Cypriot politician
- Dilan Çiçek Deniz (born 1995), Turkish actress and model
- Elif Deniz (born 1993), Turkish women's footballer
- Erhan Deniz (born 1985), Turkish kickboxer
- Frank Deniz (1912–2005), British jazz guitarist
- Fuat Deniz (1967–2007), Turkish-Swedish sociologist and writer of Assyrian descent
- Leslie Deniz (born 1962), American discus thrower
- Okan Deniz (born 1994), Turkish footballer
- Pınar Deniz (born 1993), Turkish actress
- Semih Deniz (born 1989), Turkish Paralympian middle-distance runner

== See also ==
- Deniz (given name)
- Denis of Portugal
