= Elif =

Elif may refer to the following:

== People ==
- Elif (name)
- Elif, stage name of German singer Elif Demirezer

== Other ==
- Elif, Gaziantep, a town in the Araban District of Gaziantep Province, Turkey
- Elif (TV series), a Turkish TV series
- In computing, used as part of a Structured If (short for else if)
- First letter of the alphabet:
  - A
  - Aleph
  - Alpha
