= Karapınar, Zonguldak =

Karapınar
- Village
- Location within Turkey
- Country: Turkey
- Province: Zonguldak
- District: Zonguldak
- Population (2022): 311
- Time zone: UTC+3 (TRT)

Karapınar is a village in Zonguldak District, Zonguldak Province, Turkey. Its population is 311 (2022).
