= Dadılar, Ağaçören =

Dadılar
- Village
- Location within Turkey Location within Turkey Central Anatolia
- Coordinates: 38°49′N 34°00′E
- Country: Turkey
- Province: Aksaray
- District: Ağaçören
- Population (2021): 85
- Time zone: UTC+3 (TRT)

Dadılar is a village in the Ağaçören District, Aksaray Province, Turkey. Its population is 85 (2021).
