= Elif Su İltaş =

Turkish arm wrestler

Elşf Su İltaş
Personal information
- Nationality: Turkish
- Born: 2011 (age 14–15) Sarıhasanlı, Ağaçören, Aksaray, Turkey
- Years active: 2025–

Sport
- Country: Turkey
- Sport: Armwrestling
- Events: Sub-Junior Girls +70 kg Right&Left arm
- Club: Tuncel SK
Medal record
Women's Arm wrestling
Representing Turkey
World Championship
Gold medal – first place	2025 Albena	Sub-Junior Girls +70 kg Right
Gold medal – first place	2025 Albena	Sub-Junior Girls +70 kg Left
Gold medal – first place	2025 Delhi	Sub-Junior Girls +70 kg Right
Gold medal – first place	2025 Delhi	Sub-Junior Girls +70 kg Left
European Championship
Gold medal – first place	2025 Budapest	Sub-Junior Girls +70 kg Right
Gold medal – first place	2025 Budapest	Sub-Junior Girls +70 kg Left

Elif Su İltaş, also known as Elif İltaş or Elifsu İltaş, is a Turkish world and European champion armwrestler who competes in both arms of Sub-Junior Girls +70 kg events.

== Sport career ==
İltaş competes in both right and left arm of Sub-Junior (under 18–23) Girls +70 kg events, in Tuncel Sports Club in Ankara.

She won the gold medals in both arms t the 2025 46th World Armwrestling & 27th Para-Armwrestling Championships in Albena, Bulgaria. In 2026, she became Turkish champion in her weight class. In 2026, after becoming the Turkish champion in her division, she won gold medals in both arms at the XXXV European Armwrestling Championship in Budapest, Hungary, and at the XLVII World Armwrestling Championship in Delhi, Indşa.

== Personal life ==
Elif Su İltaş is a native of Sarıhasanlı village in Ağaçören of Aksaray Province, Turkey.

She is a student at Altındağ Mehmet Akif Ersoy Anadolu Lisesi in Ankara.
