= Elif Çomoğlu Ülgen =

Turkish diplomat (born 1971)

Turkish Ambassador to Pretoria
- In office 26 February 2017 – 23 June 2021
- Preceded by: Kaan Esener
- Succeeded by: Ayşegül Kandaş

Personal details
- Born: 1971 (age 54–55) Germany
- Children: 3
- Education: Ankara University
- Profession: Diplomat

Elif Çomoğlu Ülgen (born 1971 in Germany) is a Turkish diplomat who as of 2023 was the General Director of Eastern and Southern Africa in the Ministry of Foreign Affairs. Previously, Ülgen served as the ambassador of Turkey to the EU, the UN Office in Geneva, South Africa, as political consultant to NATO in Afghanistan and Libya, and as the first female Turkish Consul General to Dubai.

== Education ==
She was educated at TED Ankara College and Ankara University, Faculty of Political Sciences, Department of International Relations.

== Career ==
She joined the Turkish Foreign Ministry in 1993 and served in Pakistan. In 1995, She took office in Turkey's UN Permanent Mission in Geneva. She was a political consultant at one of the NATO headquarters in Turkey and Turkey's Permanent Representative to the EU in Brussels. She became the officer in charge of military operations in Afghanistan and Libya at the NATO Permanent Mission and one of the planners of the NATO operation in Libya.

She was appointed as the Consul General to Dubai in January 2012 and served until 2014. She was the Deputy Director General of Research at the Ministry of Foreign Affairs in between 2014 and 2017.

She resumed office as Turkey's ambassador to South Africa on February 2, 2017, and left office for Ayşegül Kandaş on June 23, 2021. She is the General Director of Eastern and Southern Africa in the Turkish Ministry of Foreign Affairs. (A role directly under Ambassador Burak Akçapar, the Deputy Minister of Foreign Affairs(Turkey) on the Ministry's organizational chart).

== Family ==
She is married to Sinan Ülgen and they have three children.
