= Saraycık, Zonguldak =

Saraycık
- Village
- Location within Turkey
- Country: Turkey
- Province: Zonguldak
- District: Zonguldak
- Population (2022): 338
- Time zone: UTC+3 (TRT)

Saraycık is a village in Zonguldak District, Zonguldak Province, Turkey. Its population is 338 (2022).
