= Hacıali, Zonguldak =

Hacıali
- Village
- Location within Turkey
- Country: Turkey
- Province: Zonguldak
- District: Zonguldak
- Population (2022): 518
- Time zone: UTC+3 (TRT)

Hacıali is a village in Zonguldak District, Zonguldak Province, Turkey. Its population is 518 (2022).
