= Keller, Zonguldak =

Keller
- Village
- Location within Turkey
- Country: Turkey
- Province: Zonguldak
- District: Zonguldak
- Population (2022): 499
- Time zone: UTC+3 (TRT)

Keller is a village in Zonguldak District, Zonguldak Province, Turkey. Its population is 499 (2022).
