= Kardeşler, Zonguldak =

Kardeşler
- Village
- Location within Turkey
- Coordinates: 41°23′52″N 31°49′45″E
- Country: Turkey
- Province: Zonguldak
- District: Zonguldak
- Population (2022): 542
- Time zone: UTC+3 (TRT)

Kardeşler is a village in Zonguldak District, Zonguldak Province, Turkey. Its population is 542 (2022).
