= Abdiuşağı, Ağaçören =

Abdiuşağı
- Village
- Location within Turkey Location within Turkey Central Anatolia
- Coordinates: 38.7854°N 33.9346°E
- Country: Turkey
- Province: Aksaray
- District: Ağaçören
- Population (2021): 77
- Time zone: UTC+3 (TRT)

Abdiuşağı is a village in the Ağaçören District, Aksaray Province, Turkey. Its population is 77 (2021).
