= Ahırlı, Ağaçören =

Ahırlı
- Village
- Location within Turkey Location within Turkey Central Anatolia
- Coordinates: 38.7260°N 33.8034°E
- Country: Turkey
- Province: Aksaray
- District: Ağaçören
- Population (2021): 146
- Time zone: UTC+3 (TRT)

Ahırlı is a village in the Ağaçören District, Aksaray Province, Turkey. Its population is 146 (2021).
