= Asal (given name) =

- Gender: Primarily female
- Language: Arabic

Origin
- Meaning: honey

Other names
- Related names: Asel

Asal is a given name ultimately derived from the Arabic ‘asal (عَسَل), meaning honey, in use in countries such as Iran and Uzbekistan.

It may refer to:

- Asal Badiee (1977–2013), Iranian actress
- Asal Pourheidari (born 1991), Iranian women’s basketball player and golfer
- Asal Saparbaeva (born 1994), Uzbek former artistic gymnast and Olympian
- Asal Shodiyeva (born 1992), Uzbek film actress and singer
- Asal Kolaar, Tamil musician
