= Kaşıçalıklar =

- Village
- Location within Turkey Location within Turkey Central Anatolia
- Coordinates: 38°47′N 33°53′E
- Country: Turkey
- Province: Aksaray
- District: Ağaçören
- Population (2021): 49
- Time zone: UTC+3 (TRT)

Kaşıçalıklar is a village in the Ağaçören District, Aksaray Province, Turkey. Its population is 49 (2021).
