= Göynük, Ağaçören =

Göynük
- Village
- Location within Turkey Location within Turkey Central Anatolia
- Country: Turkey
- Province: Aksaray
- District: Ağaçören
- Population (2021): 51
- Time zone: UTC+3 (TRT)

Göynük is a village in the Ağaçören District, Aksaray Province, Turkey. Its population is 51 (2021).
