= Emirhan Sarımustafaoğlu =

Turkish skateboarder (born 2010)

Personal information
- Nationality: Turkish
- Born: 31 July 2010 (age 16) Turkey

Sport
- Country: Turkey
- Sport: Skateboarding
- Event: Street
Medal record
Skateboarding
Representing Turkey

Emirhan Sarımustafaoğlu (born 31 July 2010) is a Turkish skateboarder competing in the men's street event. He represented Turkey at the 2026 Mediterranean Games.

== Sport career ==
Sarımustafaoğlu started with skateboarding at the age of eleven in 2021. His favorite training places for skateboardimg are Maçka and Kalamış in Istanbu.

He took the third place in the first leg of the Mattia Ahmet Minguzzi Skateboarding Championship held at Sukaypark in Osmangazi, Bursa in April 2025. In July that year, he repeated his rank in the second leg of the championship.

In June 2026, he attended a testing and measurement program for Olympic national athletes by the Ministry of Youth and Sports in Ankara. At the 2026 Turkish Street Skateboarding Championships in July in Bursa, he ranked third. He was admitted to the national team, and competed at the 2026 Mediterranean Games in Taranto, Italy.

== Personal life ==
Born on 31 July 2010, Sarımustafaoğlu lives in Istanbul, Turkey.
