= Çukurören, Zonguldak =

Çukurören
- Village
- Location within Turkey
- Coordinates: 41°21′35″N 31°59′10″E
- Country: Turkey
- Province: Zonguldak
- District: Zonguldak
- Population (2022): 515
- Time zone: UTC+3 (TRT)

Çukurören is a village in Zonguldak District, Zonguldak Province, Turkey. Its population is 515 (2022).
