= Kabalaklı, Zonguldak =

Kabalaklı
- Village
- Location within Turkey
- Coordinates: 41°23′N 31°54′E
- Country: Turkey
- Province: Zonguldak
- District: Zonguldak
- Population (2022): 416
- Time zone: UTC+3 (TRT)

Kabalaklı is a village in Zonguldak District, Zonguldak Province, Turkey. Its population is 416 (2022).
