= Alancık, Zonguldak =

Alancık
- Village
- Location within Turkey
- Coordinates: 41.3793°N 31.8066°E
- Country: Turkey
- Province: Zonguldak
- District: Zonguldak
- Population (2022): 249
- Time zone: UTC+3 (TRT)

Alancık is a village in Zonguldak District, Zonguldak Province, Turkey. Its population is 249 (2022).
