= Zonguldak District =

District of Zonguldak Province, Turkey

- District
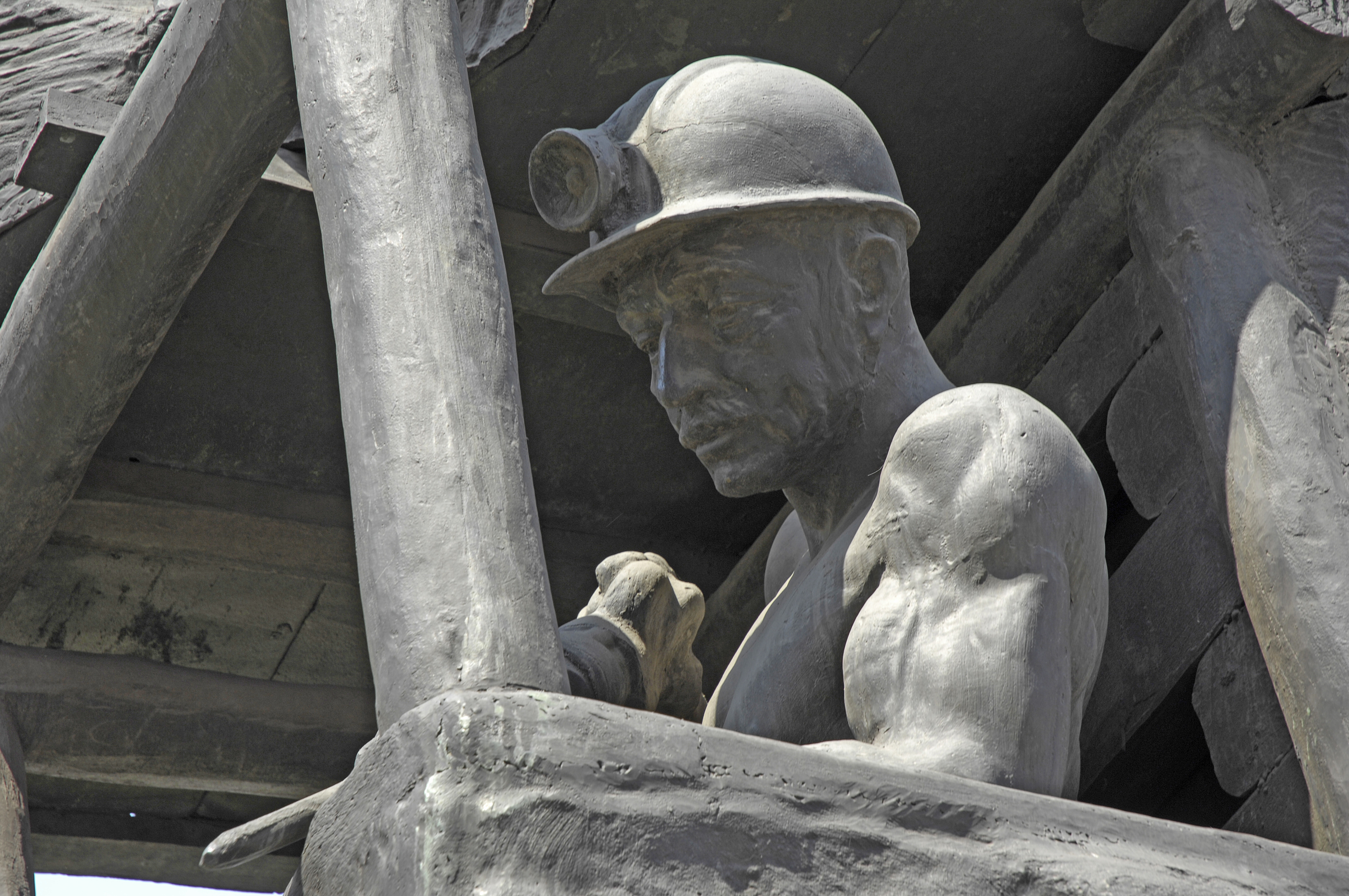
- sculpture of a coal miner by Tangut Öktem, Zonguldak

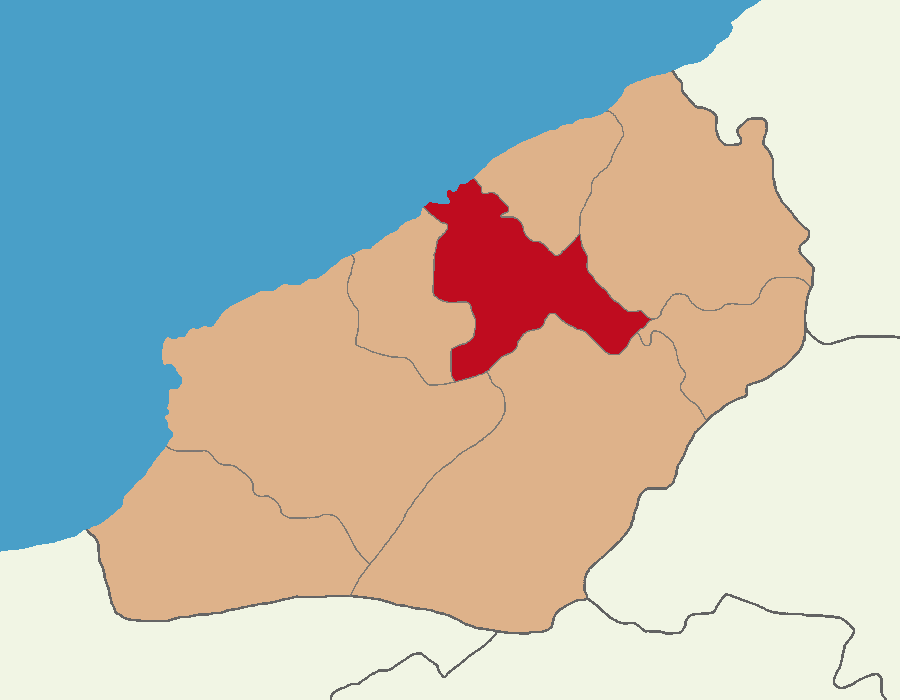
- Map showing Zonguldak District in Zonguldak Province

- Location within Turkey
- Coordinates: 41°26′N 31°48′E
- Country: Turkey
- Province: Zonguldak
- Seat: Zonguldak
- Area: 272 km^{2} (105 sq mi)
- Population (2022): 118,776
  - Density: 437/km^{2} (1,130/sq mi)
- Time zone: UTC+3 (TRT)

Zonguldak District (also: Merkez, meaning "central" in Turkish) is a district of the Zonguldak Province of Turkey. Its seat is the city of Zonguldak. Its area is 272 km^{2}, and its population is 118,776 (2022).

== Composition ==
There are four municipalities in Zonguldak District:

- Beycuma
- Elvanpazarcık
- Karaman
- Zonguldak

There are 23 villages in Zonguldak District:

- Alancık
- Ayvatlar
- Çağlı
- Çukurören
- Eceler
- Hacıali
- Himmetoğlu
- Kabalaklı
- Kaleoğlu
- Karadere
- Karapınar
- Kardeşler
- Keller
- Köroğlu
- Korucak
- Kumtarla
- Olukyanı
- Osmanlı
- Sapça
- Saraycık
- Sarımsak
- Sofular
- Taşçılar
