= Hacıahmetlidavutlu, Ağaçören =

Hacıahmetlidavutlu
- Village
- Location within Turkey Location within Turkey Central Anatolia
- Coordinates: 38°48′N 33°50′E
- Country: Turkey
- Province: Aksaray
- District: Ağaçören
- Population (2021): 129
- Time zone: UTC+3 (TRT)

Hacıahmetlidavutlu is a village in the Ağaçören District, Aksaray Province, Turkey. Its population is 129 (2021).
