= Sarımsak, Zonguldak =

Sarımsak
- Village
- Location within Turkey
- Country: Turkey
- Province: Zonguldak
- District: Zonguldak
- Population (2022): 131
- Time zone: UTC+3 (TRT)

Sarımsak is a village in Zonguldak District, Zonguldak Province, Turkey. Its population is 131 (2022).
