= Zeynep Nur Agin =

Turkish karateka (born 2007)

- Born: 22 March 2007 (age 19); Turkey
- Nationality: Turkish
- Style: Karate Kumite, Kata
- Team: Ankara EGO SK

Zeynep Nur Agin (born 22 March 2007) is a Turkish karateka who competes in the kumite -55 kg and kata events.

== Sport career ==
Agin is a member of EGO (for Elektrik, Gaz, Otobüs) SK of the Ankara Metropolitan Municipality. She competes in the kumite -55 kg and kata events.

At the 2025 Summer Deaflympics in Tokyo, Japan, she took a bronze medal in the kata team event with teammates Sinem Özkan and Tuğçe Duyuş.

She won the gold medal in the kumite -55 kg event and the bronze medal in the kata event at the 2025 Turkish Seniors Veterans Deaf Karate and Para Karate Championships.

== Personal life ==
Zeynep Nur Agin was born on 22 March 2007. She lives in Andiçen Neighborhood of Sincan, Ankara, central Turkey.
