= Yağmur =

- Language: Turkish

Origin
- Meaning: Rain

Yağmur (pronounced [ˈjaːmuɾ]) is a unisex Turkish given name and surname. In Turkish, "yağmur" means "rain." Notable people with the name include:

== Given name ==
- Ece Yağmur Yavuz (born 2004), Turkish artistic gymnast
- Yağmur Bembeyaz (born 1999), Turkish handball player
- Yağmur Mislina Kılıç (born 1996), Turkish volleyball player
- Yağmur Koçyiğit (born 1988), Turkish volleyball player
- Yağmur Sarıgül (born 1979), Turkish songwriter
- Yağmur Şengül (born 1994), Turkish para-archer
- Yağmur Tanrısevsin (born 1991), Turkish actress
- Yağmur Uraz (born 1990), Turkish football player

== Surname ==
- Eser Yağmur (born 1983), Turkish football player
- Mehmet Yağmur (born 1987), Turkish basketball player
