= Kederli, Ağaçören =

Kederli
- Village
- Location within Turkey Location within Turkey Central Anatolia
- Coordinates: 38°49′N 33°57′E
- Country: Turkey
- Province: Aksaray
- District: Ağaçören
- Population (2021): 400
- Time zone: UTC+3 (TRT)

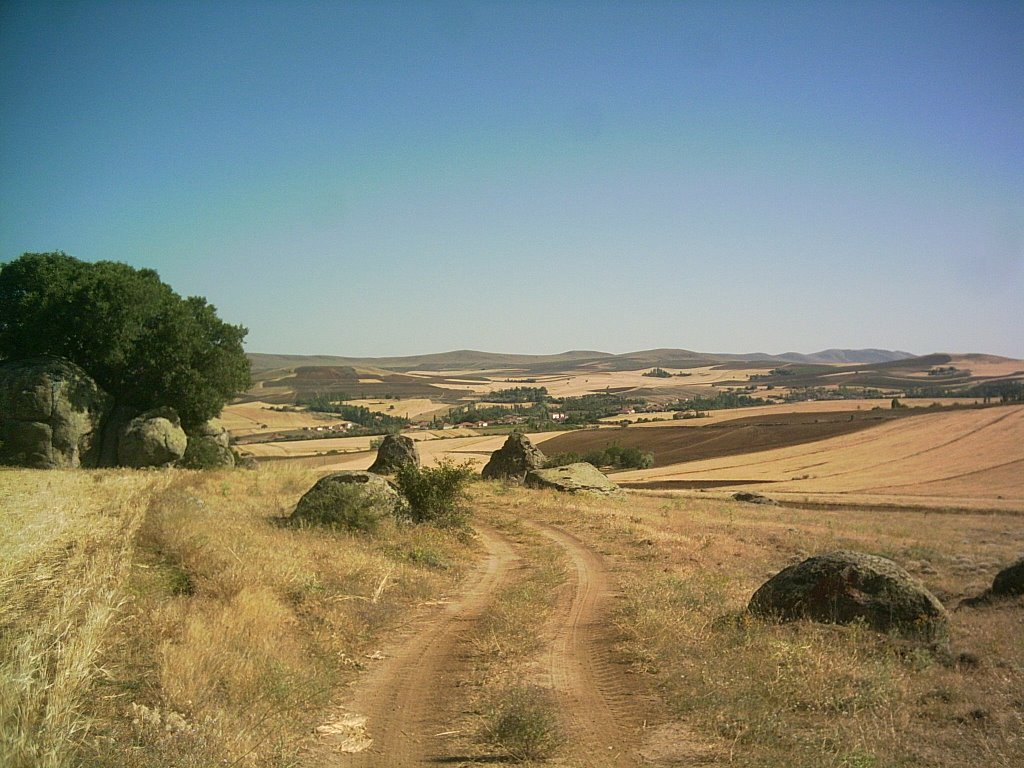
Kederli

Kederli is a village in the Ağaçören District, Aksaray Province, Turkey. Its population is 400 (2021).
