= Ayvatlar, Zonguldak =

Ayvatlar
- Village
- Location within Turkey
- Coordinates: 41°17′27″N 31°48′37″E
- Country: Turkey
- Province: Zonguldak
- District: Zonguldak
- Population (2022): 377
- Time zone: UTC+3 (TRT)

Ayvatlar is a village in Zonguldak District, Zonguldak Province, Turkey. Its population is 377 (2022).
