= Eceler, Zonguldak =

Eceler
- Village
- Location within Turkey
- Coordinates: 41°20′08″N 32°00′48″E
- Country: Turkey
- Province: Zonguldak
- District: Zonguldak
- Population (2022): 470
- Time zone: UTC+3 (TRT)

Eceler is a village in Zonguldak District, Zonguldak Province, Turkey. Its population is 470 (2022).
