= Sinem Özkan =

Turkish karateka (born 2002)

- Born: 2002 (age 23–24); Samsun, Turkey
- Nationality: Turkish
- Style: Karate Kumite
- Team: Samsun GSK
- Trainer: Erol Kutlu

Other information
- University: Ondokuz Mayıs University

Sinem Özkan (born 2002) is a Turkish karateka who competes in the kumite -61 kg and kata events.

== Sport career ==
During her high school education, Özkan started practicing karate, encouraged and coached by her physical education teacher Mehmet Levent Duman. She is a member of Samsun GSK, where she is coached by Erol Kutlu.

She competed at the 2021 Summer Deaflympics in Caxias do Sul , Brazil, which took place in May 2022. She won two silver medals in the kumite -61 kg, and kumite team event with teammates Melek Morgil, Kader Işık Afşar and Melek Özkaya, as well as a bronze medal in the kata team event with teammates Melek Morgil and Kader Işık Afşar.

In January 2023, she became champion in the kumite -61 kg and kata events at the Turkish Deaf Karate Championships in Gaziantep. The same year, she became again champion at the Turkish Deaf Sports Championships in Mersin in February 2023.

She won two gold medals in the kumite -61 kg and kata events at the 2024 International Bosphorus Karate Championships in Istanbul, Turkey.

At the 2025 Summer Deaflympics in Tokyo, Japan, she took two bronze medals, in the kumite -61 kg event, and kata team event with teammates Zeynep Nur Agin and Tuğçe Duyuş.

== Personal life ==
Born in 2002, Sinem Özkan is a native of Samsun, northern Turkey.

She finished 19 Mayıs Hamidiye Anadolu İmam Hatip High School in her hometown. She studies in the Department of Sports Management of the Faculty of Sports Science at Ondokuz Mayıs University in Samsun. In May 2022, she was in the university's first year.
