= Sarıhasanlı =

- Village
- Location within Turkey Location within Turkey Central Anatolia
- Coordinates: 38°54′N 33°52′E
- Country: Turkey
- Province: Aksaray
- District: Ağaçören
- Population (2021): 184
- Time zone: UTC+3 (TRT)

Sarıhasanlı is a village in the Ağaçören District, Aksaray Province, Turkey. Its population is 184 (2021).
