= Çağlı, Zonguldak =

Çağlı
- Village
- Location within Turkey
- Coordinates: 41°23′57″N 31°47′42″E
- Country: Turkey
- Province: Zonguldak
- District: Zonguldak
- Population (2022): 197
- Time zone: UTC+3 (TRT)

Çağlı is a village in Zonguldak District, Zonguldak Province, Turkey. Its population is 197 (2022).
