= Kurtini, Ağaçören =

Kurtini
- Village
- Location within Turkey Location within Turkey Central Anatolia
- Coordinates: 38°44′14″N 33°51′04″E
- Country: Turkey
- Province: Aksaray
- District: Ağaçören
- Population (2021): 103
- Time zone: UTC+3 (TRT)

Kurtini is a village in the Ağaçören District, Aksaray Province, Turkey. Its population is 103 (2021).
