= Yenişabanlı, Ağaçören =

Yenişabanlı
- Village
- Location in Turkey Yenişabanlı (Turkey Central Anatolia)
- Coordinates: 38°52′N 33°52′E
- Country: Turkey
- Province: Aksaray
- District: Ağaçören
- Population (2021): 233
- Time zone: UTC+3 (TRT)

Yenişabanlı is a village in the Ağaçören District, Aksaray Province, Turkey. Its population is 233 (2021).
