= Sapça, Zonguldak =

Sapça
- Village
- Location within Turkey
- Coordinates: 41.4192°N 31.9306°E
- Country: Turkey
- Province: Zonguldak
- District: Zonguldak
- Population (2022): 253
- Time zone: UTC+3 (TRT)

Sapça is a village in Zonguldak District, Zonguldak Province, Turkey. Its population is 253 (2022).
