= Sofular, Zonguldak =

Sofular
- Village
- Location within Turkey
- Coordinates: 41°25′47″N 31°56′29″E
- Country: Turkey
- Province: Zonguldak
- District: Zonguldak
- Population (2022): 355
- Time zone: UTC+3 (TRT)

Sofular is a village in Zonguldak District, Zonguldak Province, Turkey. Its population is 355 (2022).
