= Himmetoğlu, Zonguldak =

Himmetoğlu
- Village
- Location within Turkey
- Country: Turkey
- Province: Zonguldak
- District: Zonguldak
- Population (2022): 745
- Time zone: UTC+3 (TRT)

Himmetoğlu is a village in Zonguldak District, Zonguldak Province, Turkey. Its population is 745 (2022).
