= Osmanlı, Zonguldak =

Osmanlı
- Village
- Location within Turkey
- Coordinates: 41.3877°N 31.9538°E
- Country: Turkey
- Province: Zonguldak
- District: Zonguldak
- Population (2022): 587
- Time zone: UTC+3 (TRT)

Osmanlı is a village in Zonguldak District, Zonguldak Province, Turkey. Its population is 587 (2022).
