= Kılıçlı =

Kılıçlı may refer to:

- Kılıçlı, Ağaçören, a village in Aksaray Province, Turkey
- Kılıçlı, Taşköprü, a village
- Kılıçlı, Yüreğir, a village in Adana Province, Turkey
- Deniz Kılıçlı (born 1990), Turkish basketball player

== See also ==
- Qılıçlı (disambiguation)
