= Ayşegül Kandaş =

Turkish diplomat (born 1967)

Turkish Ambassador to South Africa
- In office 24 June 2021 – 12 November 2024
- Preceded by: Elif Çomoğlu Ülgen
- Succeeded by: Kezban Nilvana Darama Yıldırımgeç

Personal details
- Born: 1967 (age 58–59) Istanbul
- Education: Boğaziçi University
- Profession: Diplomat

Ayşegül Kandaş (born 1967) is a Turkish diplomat who served as Turkey's ambassador to South Africa.

== Education ==
She graduated from high school at Robert College in 1985 and earned her first degree in 1989 from the Boğaziçi University Faculty of Economic and Administrative Sciences, Department of Political Science and International Relations. Kandaş obtained four master’s degrees from institutions in Istanbul, Bruges, Seattle, and the Turkish Republic of Northern Cyprus.

In 1990, she earned her first master’s degree in European Economic Community Politics (non-thesis) from Marmara University in Istanbul. She received an M.A. in International Studies - Middle East Politics from the University of Washington, Faculty of International Relations, in 1992. In 1997, Kandaş completed her third master’s degree at the College of Europe in Bruges in European Political and Administrative Studies. Finally, in 2014, she earned a master’s degree in Counseling and Psychology from Near East University.

== Career ==
She worked in the private sector from 1989 to 1993, after which she joined the Turkish Ministry of Foreign Affairs as a candidate career officer. From 1993 to 1995, she served as Deputy Director General for the Middle East and Africa. Between 1995 and 1997, she was the Third Secretary at the Turkish Embassy in Baku. She then served as Second Secretary at the Permanent Mission to the Common Market (later the European Union) in Brussels from 1997 to 2000.

From 2000 to 2002, she held roles as Second Secretary and later First Secretary at the Ministry of Foreign Affairs, Deputy Directorate General for the European Union. From 2003 to 2006, she served as First Secretary and Counsellor at the Turkish Embassy in Berlin. Between 2007 and 2009, she was Chief of Section and Head of Department at the Ministry of Foreign Affairs, Department for Consular IT Services. From 2009 to 2014, she served as First Counsellor and Minister Counsellor at the Turkish Embassy in Nicosia, TRNC.

From 2014 to 2018, she was Head of Department at the Ministry of Foreign Affairs, Deputy Directorate General for the European Union. From 2018 to June 2021, she served as Minister Plenipotentiary and Deputy Director General at the Ministry of Foreign Affairs, Deputy Directorate General for Citizens Living Abroad and Estates.

Kandaş served as the ambassador of Turkey to South Africa, also accredited to Lesotho and Eswatini, from 24 June 2021 until 12 November 2024.
