= Oymaağaç, Ağaçören =

Oymaağaç
- Village
- Location within Turkey Location within Turkey Central Anatolia
- Coordinates: 38.7163°N 33.8656°E
- Country: Turkey
- Province: Aksaray
- District: Ağaçören
- Population (2021): 53
- Time zone: UTC+3 (TRT)

Oymaağaç is a village in the Ağaçören District, Aksaray Province, Turkey. Its population is 53 (2021).
