= Hüsrevköy, Ağaçören =

Hüsrevköy
- Village
- Country: Turkey
- Province: Aksaray
- District: Ağaçören
- Population (2021): 127
- Time zone: UTC+3 (TRT)

Hüsrevköy is a village in the Ağaçören District, Aksaray Province, Turkey. Its population is 127 (2021).
