= Olukyanı, Zonguldak =

Olukyanı
- Village
- Location within Turkey
- Country: Turkey
- Province: Zonguldak
- District: Zonguldak
- Population (2022): 188
- Time zone: UTC+3 (TRT)

Olukyanı is a village in Zonguldak District, Zonguldak Province, Turkey. Its population is 188 (2022).
