= Aytaç =

Aytaç is a Turkish given name and surname. Ay is the Turkish word for "moon" and taç for "crown", so Aytaç can be translated as "crown of the moon" or "moon crown". People named Aytaç include:

== Given name ==
- Aytaç Şaşmaz (born 1998), Turkish actor
- Aytaç Ak (born 1985), Turkish footballer
- Aytaç Biter (born 1965), Turkish auto racing driver
- Aytaç Durak (born 1938), Turkish politician
- Aytaç Ercan (born 1976), Turkish Paralympian wheelchair basketballer
- Aytaç Kara (born 1993), Turkish footballer
- Aytaç Özkul (born 1989), Turkish basketball player
- Aytaç Yalman (1940–2020), Turkish general (ret.)

== Surname ==
- Kadri Aytaç (1931–2003), Turkish footballer
- Sakıb Aytaç (born 1991), Turkish footballer
