= Deniz Kuypers =

Libris Prize Shortlisted Dutch-American writer

Deniz Kuypers is a Dutch-American writer. Born in Hengelo in the Netherlands to a Turkish father and a Dutch mother, he studied English literature at the University of Amsterdam and moved to the United States at age 20. He has published three novels, in Dutch. His 2021 partly autobiographical novel De atlas van overal ("The atlas of everything") was shortlisted for the 2022 Libris Prize. He lives in San Francisco.

== De atlas van overal ==
De atlas van overal is a partly autobiographical novel in which the author searches for aspects of his father's life he never knew, particularly loss. Kuypers' father was born in Turkey, and left for the Netherlands in the 1960s, leaving a wife and four living children behind. In the Netherlands he started another family and had two children, but was a violent man, quick to anger. One of the many barriers between father and son is language: the father barely speaks Dutch, and Kuypers did not speak Turkish. Trouw praised the novel as a "mercilessly honest and especially beautiful novel, a monument for his children"; Kuypers said he wrote the novel also so his children would actually get to know him, so they would be "beside" him, not below him, like he was below his father.

== Books ==
- Dagen zonder Dulci (2013)
- Het ruisen van de wereld (2014)
- De atlas van overal (2021)
