= Kaan Esener =

Turkish diplomat

Ambassador of Turkey to Council of Europe
- Incumbent
- Assumed office ?

Ambassador of Turkey to South Africa
- In office ?

Personal details
- Born: 1965 (age 59–60); Turkey

Kaan Esener (born 1965) is a Turkish diplomat, current ambassador of Turkey to Council of Europe and former ambassador of Turkey to South Africa.
