= Ağaçören District =

District of Aksaray Province, Turkey

- District
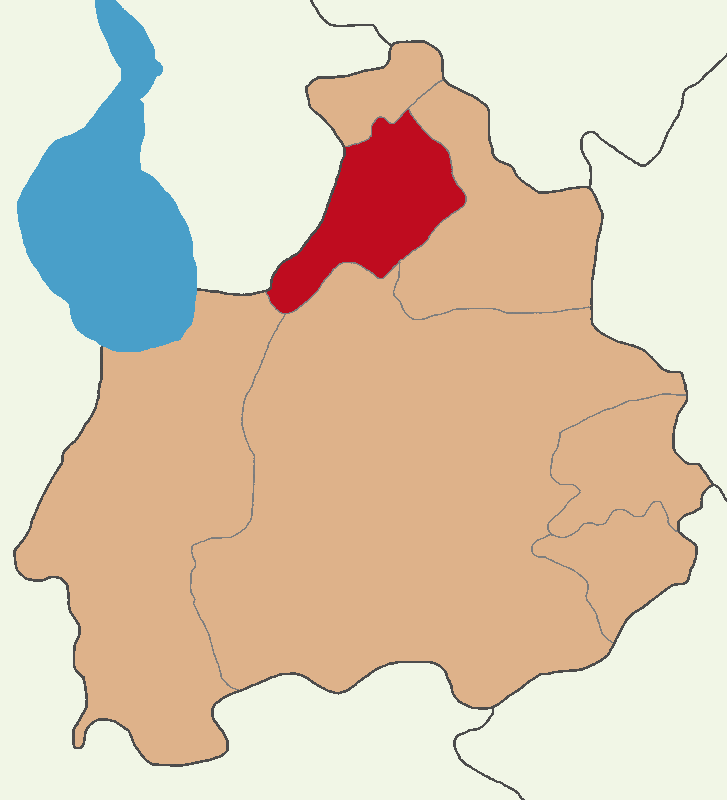
- Map showing Ağaçören District in Aksaray Province

- Location within Turkey Location within Turkey Central Anatolia
- Coordinates: 38°52′N 33°55′E
- Country: Turkey
- Province: Aksaray
- Seat: Ağaçören
- Area: 407 km^{2} (157 sq mi)
- Population (2025): 7,480
  - Density: 18.4/km^{2} (47.6/sq mi)
- Time zone: UTC+3 (TRT)
- Website: www.agacoren.gov.tr

Ağaçören District is a district of Aksaray Province, located in the Central Anatolia region of Turkey. Spread over an area of 407 km^{2} (157 sq mi), it had a population of 7,480 in 2025. The district consists of the municipality of Ağaçören, and 27 villages.

== History ==
The region was settled by the Hittites in the fourth century BCE. It formed part of the Cappadocia region during the rule of the Byzantine Empire. In the eleventh century CE the region was settled by Pechenegs and Oghuz Turks. It later came under the control of the Seljuk Sultanate, followed by the Karamanids. The region was earlier known as Panlı from the Ottoman period. Panlı was part of the town of Aksaray, and in 1933, Aksaray was elevated as a district, and became part of Ankara Province. It was named as Ağaçören in 1961, and was established as a district of Aksaray Province in 1989.

== Geography ==
Ağaçören is a district of Aksaray Province, located in the Central Anatolia region of Turkey. It is spread over an area of 407 km^{2} (157 sq mi), of which 237.37 km^{2} (91.65 sq mi) was classified as farmland in 2025. The district is situated in the vicinity of Lake Tuz, and the Peçenek Özü river passes through the district. It has an average elevation of 1,100 m (3,600 ft), and the geography consists of volcanic tuff based rocks in the eastern part of the district, and steppe.

=== Administrative divisions ===
The district consists of the municipality of Ağaçören, and 27 villages.

- Abalı
- Abdiuşağı
- Ahırlı
- Avşar
- Çatalçeşme
- Dadılar
- Demircili
- Göllü
- Göynük
- Güzelöz
- Hacıahmetlidavutlu
- Hacıahmetlitepeköy
- Hacıismailli
- Hüsrevköy
- Kaşıçalıklar
- Kederli
- Kılıçlı
- Kırımini
- Kurtini
- Kütüklü
- Oymaağaç
- Sarıağıl
- Sarıhasanlı
- Sofular
- Yağmurhüyüğü
- Yenice
- Yenişabanlı

== Demographics and economy ==
According to 2025 population statistics published by the Turkish Statistical Institute, Ağaçören had a population of 7,480 inhabitants, including 3,701 females and 3,779 males. It is the second least populated district in the province, and the population, which was 11,870 in 2007, has steadily declined over the years, which has been attributed to migration of people, who reside along the mountainous areas in the district, to other provinces. The census recorded 373 people as illiterate.

Agriculture is dependent upon the Peçenek Özü. Major crops grown include wheat, barley, chickpeas, and beet.
