= Sarıağıl, Ağaçören =

Sarıağıl
- Village
- Location within Turkey Location within Turkey Central Anatolia
- Country: Turkey
- Province: Aksaray
- District: Ağaçören
- Population (2021): 214
- Time zone: UTC+3 (TRT)

Sarıağıl is a village in the Ağaçören District, Aksaray Province, Turkey. Its population is 214 (2021).
