= Asel (given name) =

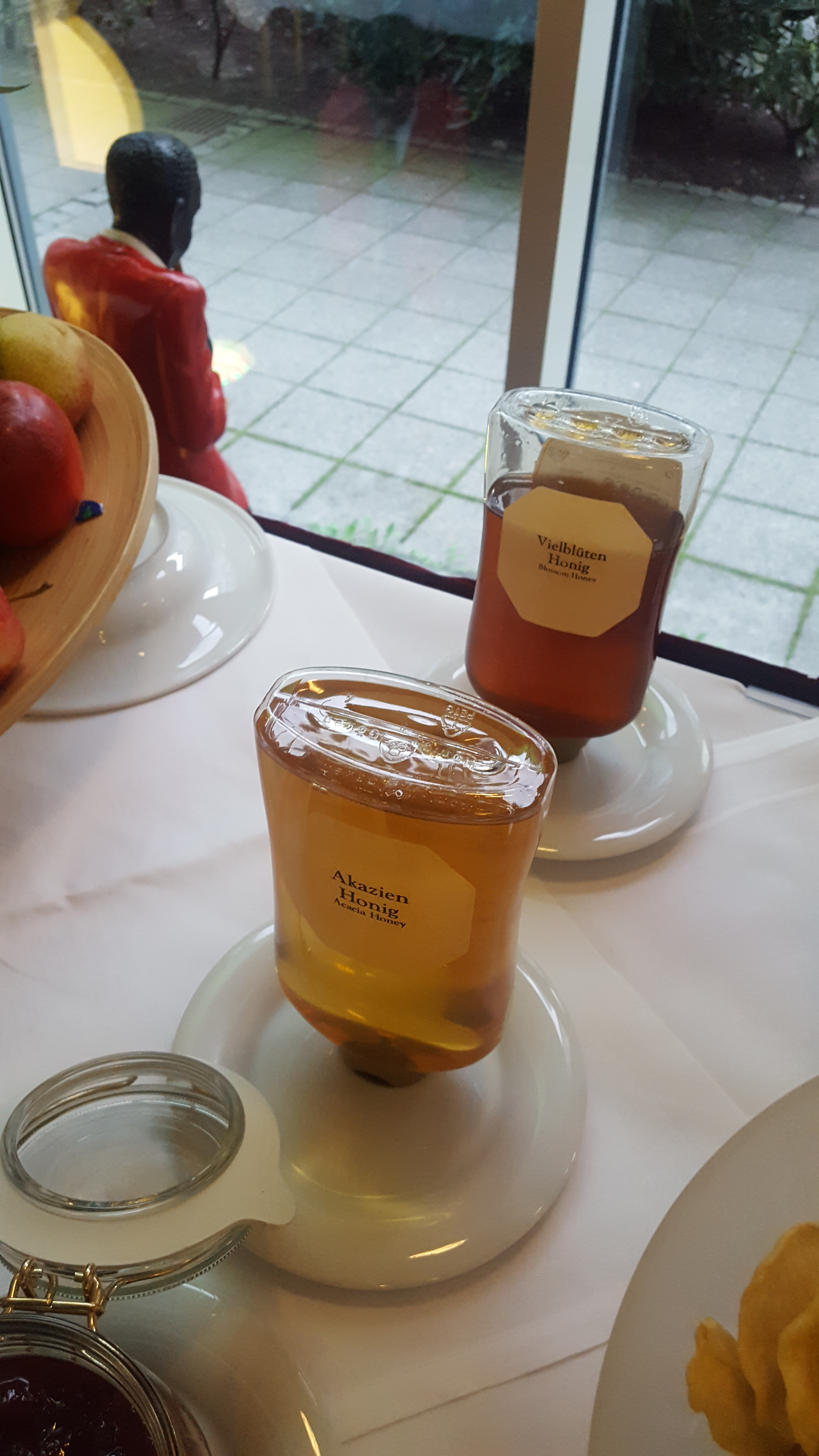
- The name Asel means honey.
- Gender: Unisex
- Language: Arabic

Origin
- Meaning: Honey
- Region of origin: Iran, Israel, Kazakhstan, Kyrgyzstan, Sri Lanka, Turkey

Other names
- Related names: Asal

Asel or Assel is a given name. It is ultimately derived from the Arabic ‘asal (عَسَل), meaning honey, in use in countries such as Iran, Kazakhstan, Kyrgyzstan, and Turkey. It was among the ten most popular names for newborn girls in Turkey in 2021.

It is also a masculine name in use in Sri Lanka. It may also be derived from other sources.

== People ==
- Asel Asleh (1983–2000), Israeli-Arab peace activist killed at a protest during the Second Intifada by Israeli security forces
- Assel Jakayeva (born 1980), former Kazakhstan water polo player
- Asel Kulathunga (born 1997), Sri Lankan cricketer
- Asel Roberts (born 1976), Kazakhstan born American diplomat
- Asel Sigera (born 1999), Sri Lankan cricketer
- Parke Asel Wilson (1867–1934), American professional baseball player
