= Deniz Kurtel =

- Birth name: Deniz Kurtel
- Born: İzmir, Turkey
- Genres: Deep house, tech house, house, techno, Electronica
- Years active: 2009–present
- Labels: Crosstown Rebels, Wolf + Lamb, No.19 Music, Double Standard

Deniz Kurtel is a Turkish installation artist and electronic musician. She specializes in creating interactive sculptures featuring LED lights and mirrors and has participated in various festivals, exhibitions, and design weeks around the globe. Starting with her debut album in 2009, “Music Watching Over Me,” she has regularly toured as a musician. Her song "The L Word" made NPR's Favorite Songs of 2011. Working both in Berlin and Brooklyn, she is in the process of further integrating her art and light installations into her live performances.

== Background ==
Born in İzmir, Turkey, Deniz Kurtel first developed an interest in LED installations and experimental electronic music while studying in the United States. She received her bachelor's degrees at Georgetown University in economics and sociology. She received her master's degrees in policy analysis from New York University and in quantitative analysis from Columbia University. She became heavily involved in the Wolf + Lamb events at the Marcy Hotel in Williamsburg, Brooklyn, and also began releasing music on Crosstown Rebels. Since then she has continued to tour with her music, and has developed a mobile sound and Light installation, known as the Introspectacular, which she has taken to multiple festivals throughout the US and Europe.

Installations designed and built by Deniz Kurtel have shown at Art Basel, MUTEK, and 3rd Ward, among other locations. She has performed at festivals and club venues including Ultra Music Festival, Detroit Electronic Music Festival, The BPM Festival, Sónar, Boiler Room (music project), Decibel Festival, Pacha New York, The Warehouse Project, Sankeys, Berghain Panorama Bar, Moulin Rouge, Watergate, Winter Music Conference, and Avalon Hollywood. Kurtel has both musically performed and created installations for Burning Man, De la Guarda, Fabric (club), and Luci d' Artista. In addition to her work with the musical duo Wolf + Lamb, she has also collaborated with Art Department, Guy Gerber, Jamie Jones, and Soul Clap.

== Discography ==
=== Studio albums ===
- Music Watching Over Me (Crosstown Rebels, 2011)
- The Way We Live (Wolf+Lamb Records, 2012)
