= Kılıçlı, Ağaçören =

Kılıçlı
- Village
- Location within Turkey Location within Turkey Central Anatolia
- Country: Turkey
- Province: Aksaray
- District: Ağaçören
- Population (2021): 69
- Time zone: UTC+3 (TRT)

Kılıçlı is a village in the Ağaçören District, Aksaray Province, Turkey. Its population is 69 (2021).
