= Tuğçe Duyuş =

Turkish karateka (born 1995)

- Born: 1995 (age 30–31); Turkey
- Nationality: Turkish
- Style: Karate Kata
- Team: Gaziosmanpaşa Bld. SK

Tuğçe Duyuş (born 1995) is a Turkish karateka who competes in the kata event.

== Sport career ==
Duyuş is a member of Gaziosmanpaşa Bld SK in Istanbul, Turkey. She competes in the kata event.

She took the bronze medal in the kata event at the 34th International Bosphorus Cup Karate Tournament held in Istanbul in December 2024. She won the silver medalin the kata event at the Turkish Seniors and Veterans Deaf and Para Karate Championships in Trabzon in February 2025.

At the 2025 Summer Deaflympics in Tokyo, Japan, she took a bronze medal in the kata team event with teammates Sinem Özkan and Zeynep Nur Agin.

== Personal life ==
Tuğçe Duyuş was born in 1995. She lives in Gaziosmanpaşa District of Istanbul.
