= Mebrure =

Mebrure (Arabic: ﻣﺒﺮﻭﺭﻩ)) is an adjective of Arabic origin. It is used as a feminine given name in Turkey and means "good, praised, admired, auspicious, acceptable."

Notable people with the name include:

- Mebrure Aksoley (1902–1984), Turkish educator and politician
- Mebrure Gönenç (1900–1981), Turkish school teacher and politician

== Fictional characters ==
- Mebrure, late spouse of Agah Bey in the Turkish crime drama Şahsiyet
- Mebrure Hekimoğlu, one of the main characters in the Turkish TV television series Güllerin Savaşı
