= Demircili, Ağaçören =

Demircili
- Village
- Location within Turkey Location within Turkey Central Anatolia
- Country: Turkey
- Province: Aksaray
- District: Ağaçören
- Population (2021): 111
- Time zone: UTC+3 (TRT)

Demircili is a village in the Ağaçören District, Aksaray Province, Turkey. Its population is 111 (2021).
