= Şenay Akay =

Turkish actress and model (born 1980)

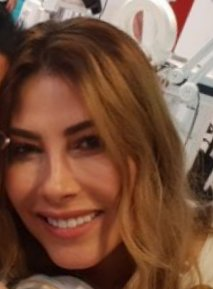
- Şenay Akay in 2020.
- Born: 16 August 1980 (age 45); Antalya, Turkey
- Occupation: Model
- Spouse(s): Buğra Özçetin (div.); Tarık Soner (2021- )

Şenay Akay (born 16 August 1980) is a Turkish actress and former model.

== Biography ==
Akay was born in 1980 in Antalya. She is the niece of singer Müammer Akay. She finished her studies at Akdeniz University. She started modelling at the age of 14. In 2001, she won both Best Model of Turkey and Best Model of the World competitions respectively.

In 2012, she wrote a book on 17 years of her life as a model. She still continues modelling at a number of fashion shows and appears on the podium occasionally. Akay was married to Buğra Özçetin for 1.5 year but divorced him in 2006 on the grounds of infidelity. In 2009, she started working as an image and appearance consultant.

== Filmography ==
Film
Year	Title	Role	Notes
2010	Pak Panter	Nadya	
TV series
Year	Title	Role	Notes
1998	Sıcak Saatler	Ester	
1999	Yüzleşme	Deniz	
2002	Bulutbey		
2004	Avrupa Yakası		Guest appearance
2007	Kara Güneş	Zeynep	
2010	Kızım Nerede?		
Programs
Year	Title	Role	Notes
2014	Arkadaşım Hoşgeldin	Şenay Akay	Guest appearance
2014	Güldür Güldür	Şenay Akay	Guest appearance
