= Sukaypark =

Park in Turkey

- Interactive map of Sukaypark
- Full name: Sukaypark Spor Tesisleri
- Address: Çukurca Yolu Cad. 48; Osmangazi, Bursa; Turkey
- Coordinates: 40.23486°N 29.03369°E
- Owner: Osmangazi Municipality

Construction
- Opened: 2008: Cable water skiing center; 2017: Skateboarding ttack
- Cost: ₺6m (approx. US$4.8m)

The Sukaypark (Turkish: Sukaypark Spor Tesisleri) is a public outdoor sports venue and recreational park owned by the District Municipality of Osmangazi in Bursa Province, western Turkey. It includes a cable water skiing center and a skateboarding track.

== Overview ==
The Sukaypark is located in Çukurcaköy viilage of Osmangazi, Bursa, western Turkey. It was built by the district municipality to a cost of ₺6m (approx. US$4.8m), and opened to the public in 2008. Spanning an area of 100,000 m^{2} (25 acres), Sukaypark is a multi-purpose park, and serves as a sports facility and recreatipnal area in summer and winter. It includes walking and joggingpaths, a bike path, a cable water skiing center and school, a skateboarding track, a children's playground, a pond with an island, a restaurant, a cafeteria With both indoor and outdoor seating and a shop for the sale and rental of sportswear. The location of the cafeteria offers a good view for watching the sport activities. The water play park for use by children, was built on a 660 m^{2} (7,100 sq ft) area. It features 20 different types of play structures, such as water slides, water hoop sets, water palms, water jets, and spider-themed water play sets.

== Cable water skiing ==
The park's main activity was initially cable water skiing. So the park's name, Sukaypark, is derived from Turkish: Su kayağı for water skiing. In addition to the cabel skiing center, there is a school for water skiing. Opened in 2008, it is the country's first cable water skiing center in international standards. The venue hosts domestic and international events including world and European championships. 2008 European Cable Water Skiing Championships, and the third leg of the 2009 Cable Water Skiing World Trophy were held at Sukaypark. 2019 Turkish Wakeboarding Clubs Championships took place at the center.

== Skateboarding ==
The skatboarding track was built inside the Sukaypark on an area of 800 m^{2} (8,600 sq ft), and was opened in 2017. It is the country's first and the only facility of its art in Olympic standards. It hosts national skateboarding festivals and tournaments. Turkish street skateboard championships organized by the Turkish Skateboarding Federation and the Anatolian Cadets Skateboarding League "ANALİG" organized by the Ministry of Youth and Sports are held at the venue.
