= Derviş Kemal Deniz =

Cypriot politician (born 1954)

Derviş Kemal Deniz (born October 2, 1954) is the former Turkish Republic of Northern Cyprus Minister of Economy and Tourism. He was appointed to these portfolios on April 28, 2005, in the 19th cabinet of TRNC under the prime minister Mehmet Ali Talat.

Deniz is a graduate of London Guildhall University, from where he obtained his Accountancy degree in 1977. He became a member of the Institute of Chartered Accountant in England and Wales in 1981. Deniz has 2 children.
