= Güzelöz, Ağaçören =

Güzelöz
- Village
- Location within Turkey Location within Turkey Central Anatolia
- Country: Turkey
- Province: Aksaray
- District: Ağaçören
- Population (2021): 179
- Time zone: UTC+3 (TRT)

Güzelöz is a village in the Ağaçören District, Aksaray Province, Turkey. Its population is 179 (2021).
