= Asal Pourheidari =

Iranian basketball player and golfer

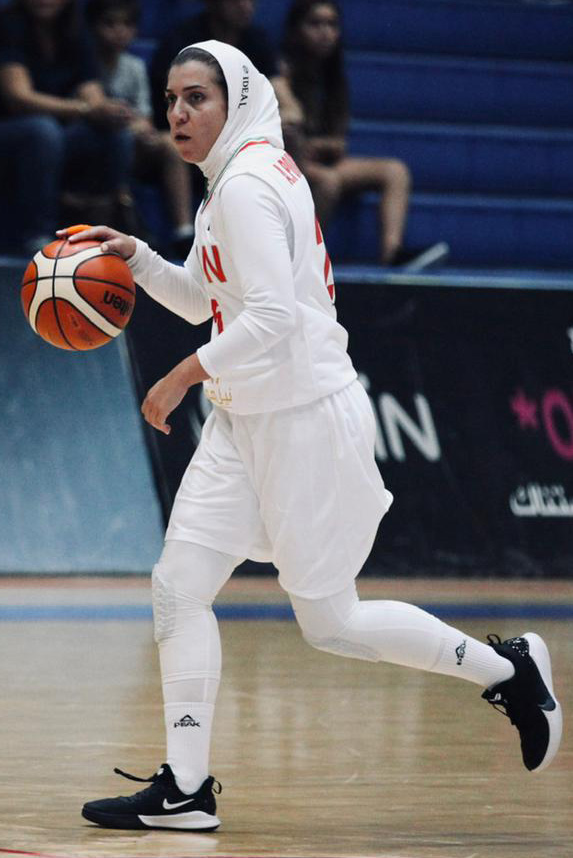
- Pourheidari in 2019

Personal information
- Native name: عسل پورحیدری
- Full name: Asal Pourheidari
- Nationality: Iranian
- Born: October 1, 1991 Tehran, Iran
- Height: 1.70 m (5 ft 7 in)
- Weight: 62 kg (137 lb)

Sport
- Sport: Basketball
- Club: Mahram

Asal Pourheidari (Persian: عسل پورحیدری; born October 30, 1991, in Tehran) is an Iranian basketball player and golfer. She is a player in the Iran women's national basketball team and Iran national golf team. She played in the Iranian Basketball Super League for seven years with Azad University and then Esteghlal teams. She was also a San Diego Mesa College California team member in 2016 and 2017. She is currently a player of the Mahram team in the Iran Women's Basketball Super League.

She played in the first official international tournament with the Iran women's national basketball team after the 1978 revolution in the West Asia 2019 tournament in Jordan. They won a bronze medal. Pourheidari played in the West Asian club games as a guest player with the Sanat Naft Abadan team in 2018 and with the Bahman team in 2019. She became the runner-up of West Asian clubs with the Bahman team in Jordan.

Pourheidari participated in the second tour of the Iran–Spain Friendship Cup golf tournament in 2007, which won first place in the women's rankings. In 2009 she became the runner-up in the Cyprus International Golf Tournament with the Iranian women's national golf team. She won third place in the 2009 World Student Championships in Italy and also received the Ethics Cup of these games. Pourheidari also played in the 26th Universiade of International University Sports Federation in Shenzhen, China, in 2011 with the Iranian student golf team.

== Personal life ==
She is the daughter of Mansour Pourheidari.

She graduated from California State University with a degree in Sport Psychology and leadership in 2020 and currently lives in the United States.
