= Ağaçören =

- Municipality
- Location in Turkey Ağaçören (Turkey Central Anatolia)
- Coordinates: 38°52′20″N 33°55′02″E
- Country: Turkey
- Province: Aksaray
- District: Ağaçören

Government
  - Mayor: Yaşar Bekleviç (MHP)
- Elevation: 1,100 m (3,600 ft)
- Population (2021): 2,878
- Time zone: UTC+3 (TRT)
- Area code: 0382
- Website: www.agacoren.bel.tr

Ağaçören, formerly Panlı, is a town in Aksaray Province in the Central Anatolia region of Turkey. It is the seat of Ağaçören District. Its population is 2,878 (2021). Its average elevation is 1,100 m (3,609 ft). The town consists of the quarters Camili, Gümüştepe, Kale, Yeni, Yurtsever and Zafer.
