= Elif Gülbayrak =

Turkish volleyball player (born 1988)

Elif Gülbayrak (born January 1, 1988, in Bursa) is a Turkish volleyball player. She is 185 cm tall. She has played for Fenerbahçe Acıbadem Team since 2007 season start and wears number 16. She played 14 times for the national team. She also played for Bursa Büyükşehir Belediyespor, Vakıfbank Güneş Sigorta and UPS.

== See also ==
- Turkish women in sports
