= Berat (name) =

Berat is a masculine given name, used among Albanians or Turks. People named Berat include:

- Berat Ahmeti (born 1995), Albanian footballer
- Berat Albayrak (born 1978), Former Turkish Minister of Economy
- Berat Buzhala, Kosovar journalist
- Berat Djimsiti (born 1993), Swiss Albanian footballer
- Berat Hyseni (born 1986), Kosovar footballer
- Berat Kalkan (born 2003), Macedonian footballer
- Berat Kısal (born 1986), Turkish volleyball player
- Berat Köse (born 1999), Finnish footballer
- Berat Luş (born 2007), Turkish footballer
- Berat Onur Pınar (born 2002), Turkish footballer
- Berat Özdemir (born 1998), Turkish football player
- Berat Sadik (born 1986), Finnish footballer
- Berat Tosun (born 1994), Turkish footballer
