= Rasih =

Rasih is a masculine given name of Arabic origin which is used in Turkey. It is a derivative of the Arabic word rusûh. According to the Turkish Language Association during the Ottoman period it was used as an adjective with the meaning "solid, durable and strong."

Notable people with the name include:

- Rasih Ulaş Bardakçı, known as Ulaş Bardakçı (1947–1972), Turkish revolutionary
- Rasih Dino (1865–1927), Albanian diplomat and politician
- Rasih Nuri İleri (1920–2014), Turkish writer and politician
