= Azal tinto =

Variety of grape

Azal Tinto
- Grape (Vitis)
- Color of berry skin: Noir
- Species: Vitis vinifera
- Also called: Amaral and other synonyms
- Origin: Portugal
- Notable regions: Minho
- Notable wines: Vinho Verde
- VIVC number: 818

Azal Tinto or Amaral is a variety of red Portuguese wine grape. It is planted in the Minho region where it is used in red Vinho Verde, while the related Azal Branco is used for white Vinho Verde.

== Synonyms ==
Azal Tinto is also known under the synonyms Amaral, Amaral Preto, Azal, Azal Preto, Cachon, Cainho Miudo, Caino, Caino Bravo, Caino Tinto, Sousao, and Sousao Galego.

Azal Tinto is also used as a synonym for Vinhão.

== See also ==
- Azal Branco
- List of Portuguese grape varieties
