= Münci =

Münci is a masculine given name used in Turkey. It is of Arabic origin and means savior and the one who gives salvation. Notable people with the name include:

== Given name ==
- Münci Kalayoğlu (1940–2024), Turkish physician
- Münci Kapani (1921–1993), Turkish academic and politician
