= Evren Erdeniz =

Turkish footballer (born 1983)

Personal information
- Date of birth: 3 April 1983 (age 43)
- Place of birth: Pazar, Turkey
- Height: 1.78 m (5 ft 10 in)
- Positions: Forward; attacking midfielder

Senior career*
| Years | Team | Apps | (Gls) |
| 2002–2003 | Pazarspor | – | (–) |
| 2003–2004 | Göztepe | 17 | (0) |
| 2004–2005 | Ankaraspor | 8 | (0) |
| 2004–2005 | → Karşıyaka (loan) | 12 | (2) |
| 2005—2009 | Ankaragücü | 7 | (0) |
| 2006–2007 | → Karşıyaka (loan) | 14 | (2) |
| 2007–2008 | → Telekomspor (loan) | 6 | (0) |
| 2009–2010 | Telekomspor | 15 | (6) |
| 2010–2011 | Çankırıspor | 12 | (0) |
| 2011 | Ofspor | 16 | (4) |
| 2012–2012 | Tepecik Belediyespor | 7 | (0) |
| 2012–2014 | Pazarspor | 45 | (10) |
- * Club domestic league appearances and goals

Evren Erdeniz (born 3 April 1983) is a Turkish former football player who played as an attacking midfielder.
