= Abalı, Ağaçören =

Abalı
- Village
- Location within Turkey Location within Turkey Central Anatolia
- Coordinates: 38°51′37″N 33°48′42″E
- Country: Turkey
- Province: Aksaray
- District: Ağaçören
- Population (2021): 147
- Time zone: UTC+3 (TRT)

Abalı is a village in the Ağaçören District, Aksaray Province, Turkey. Its population is 147 (2021).
