= Evren Özyiğit =

Turkish footballer

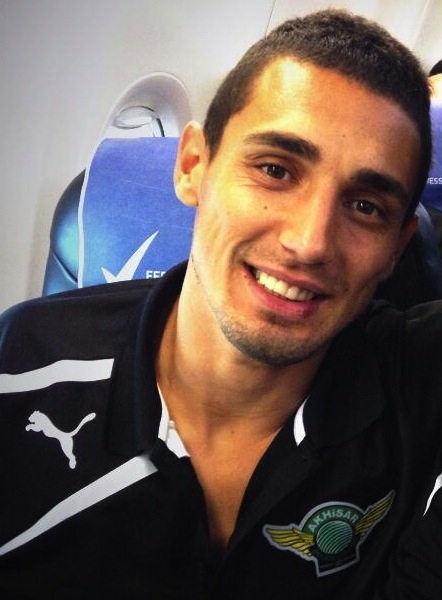

Personal information
- Full name: Evren Özyiğit
- Date of birth: 1 January 1986 (age 40)
- Place of birth: Aydın, Turkey
- Height: 1.88 m (6 ft 2 in)
- Position: Goalkeeper

Team information
- Current team: Halide Edip Adıvarspor

Senior career*
Years	Team	Apps	(Gls)
2005–2007	Muğlaspor	19	(0)
2007–2010	Ankaraspor	3	(0)
2009–2010	→ Eyüpspor (loan)	13	(0)
2010–2012	Denizlispor	32	(0)
2012–2014	Akhisar Belediyespor	4	(0)
2014–2015	Adanaspor	4	(0)
2015	Altay	0	(0)
2015–2017	Aydınspor 1923	46	(0)
2017–2018	Nazilli Belediyespor	13	(0)
2018–2019	Eyüpspor	40	(0)
2019–	Halide Edip Adıvarspor	0	(0)

International career
2007	Turkey U21	1	(0)
- * Club domestic league appearances and goals as of 23:37, 25 August 2019 (UTC)

Evren Özyiğit (born 1 January 1986) is a Turkish footballer who plays as a goalkeeper for Halide Edip Adıvarspor. He made his Süper Lig debut on 3 May 2008.
