= Qılınclı, Kalbajar =

Qılınclı
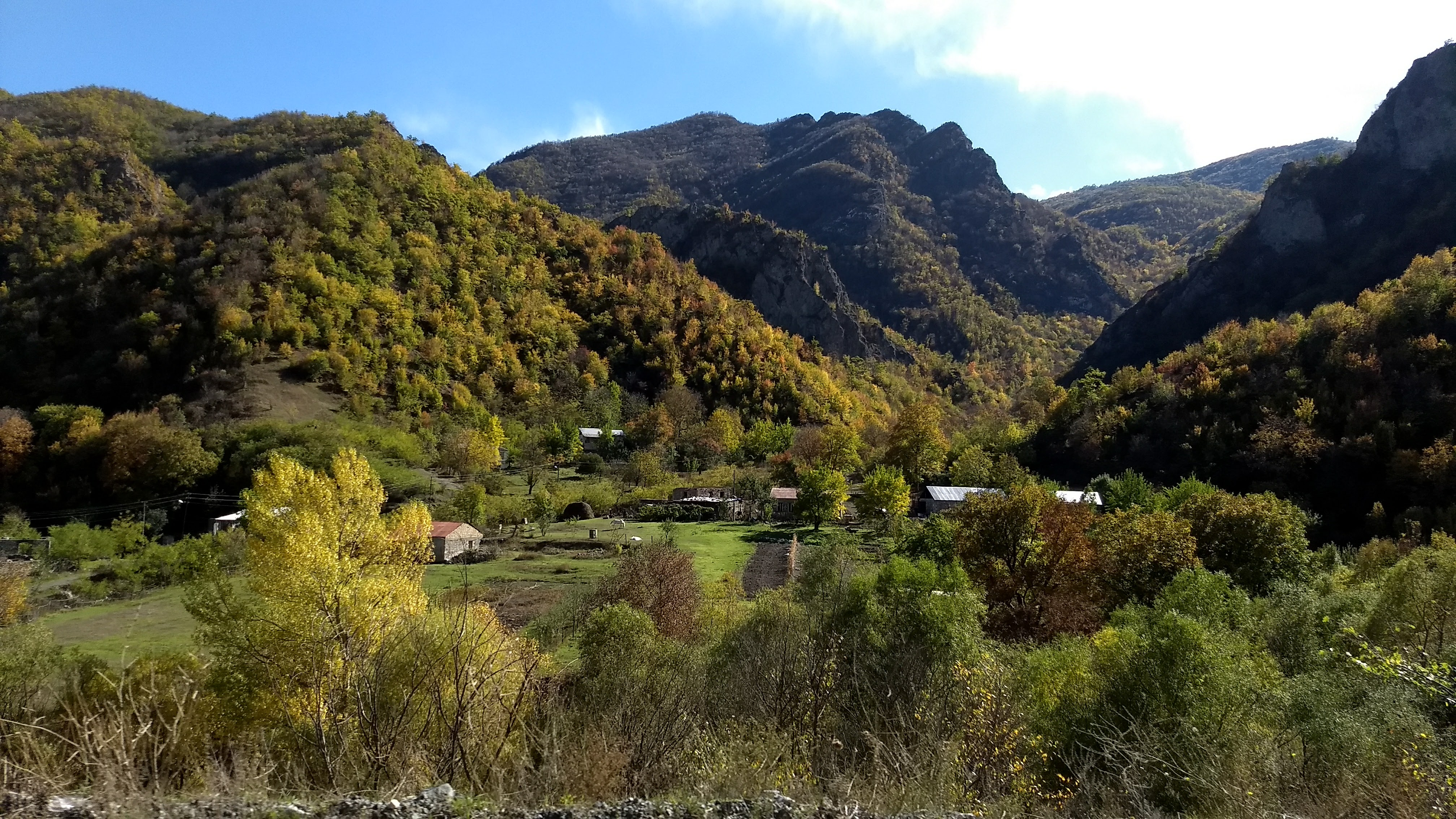

- Location within Azerbaijan Location within East Zangezur Economic Region
- Coordinates: 40°09′41.1″N 46°08′07.8″E
- Country: Azerbaijan
- District: Kalbajar

Population (2015)
  - Total: 239
- Time zone: UTC+4 (AZT)

Qılınclı (Gilinjli) is a village in the Kalbajar District of Azerbaijan.

== History ==
The village was located in the Armenian-occupied territories surrounding Nagorno-Karabakh, coming under the control of ethnic Armenian forces during the First Nagorno-Karabakh War in the early 1990s. The village subsequently became part of the breakaway Republic of Artsakh as part of its Shahumyan Province, referred to as Nor Brajur (Armenian: Նոր Բրաջուր). It was returned to Azerbaijan as part of the 2020 Nagorno-Karabakh ceasefire agreement.

== Demographics ==
The village had 165 inhabitants in 2005, and 239 inhabitants in 2015.

== Gallery ==
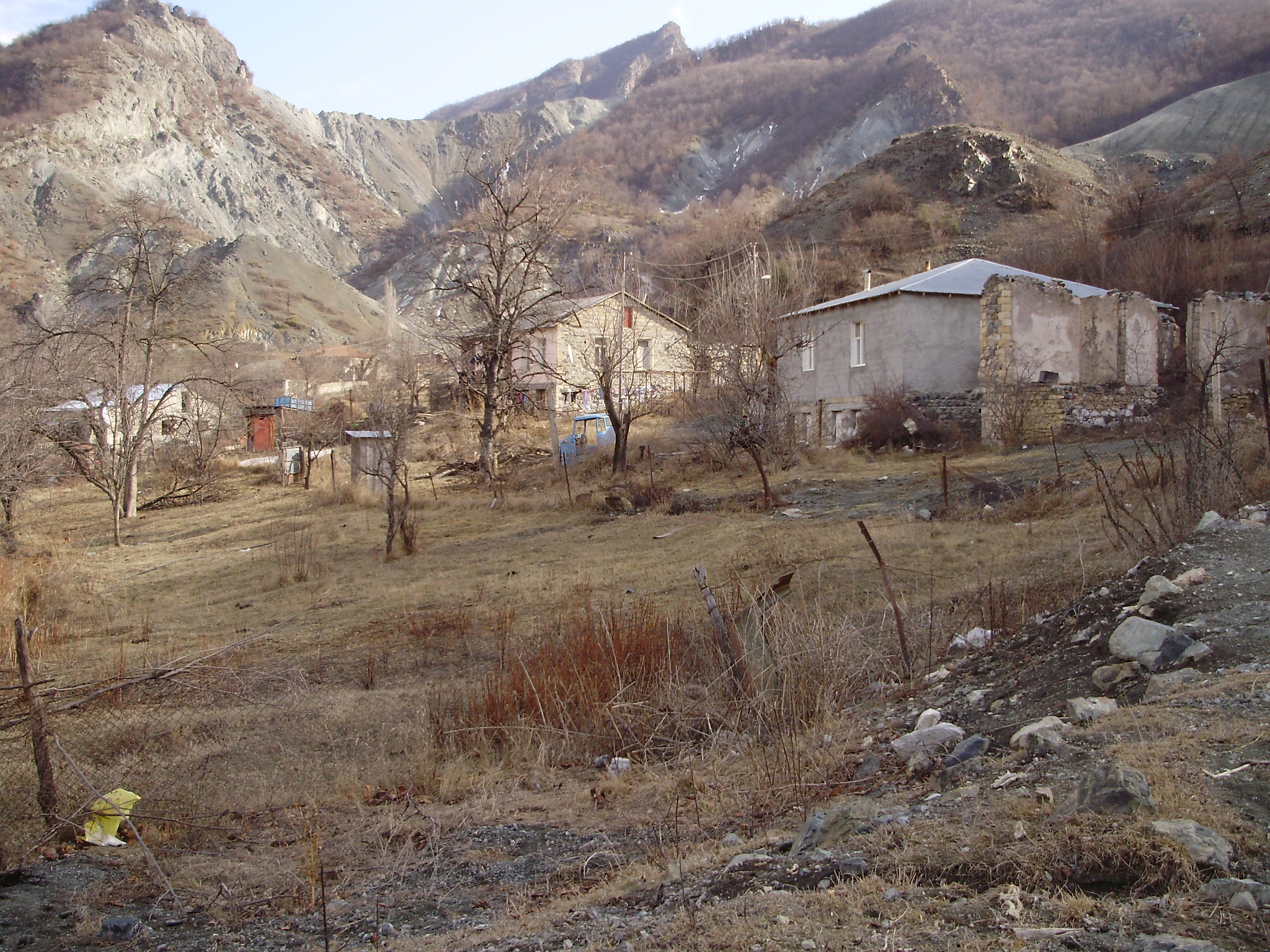

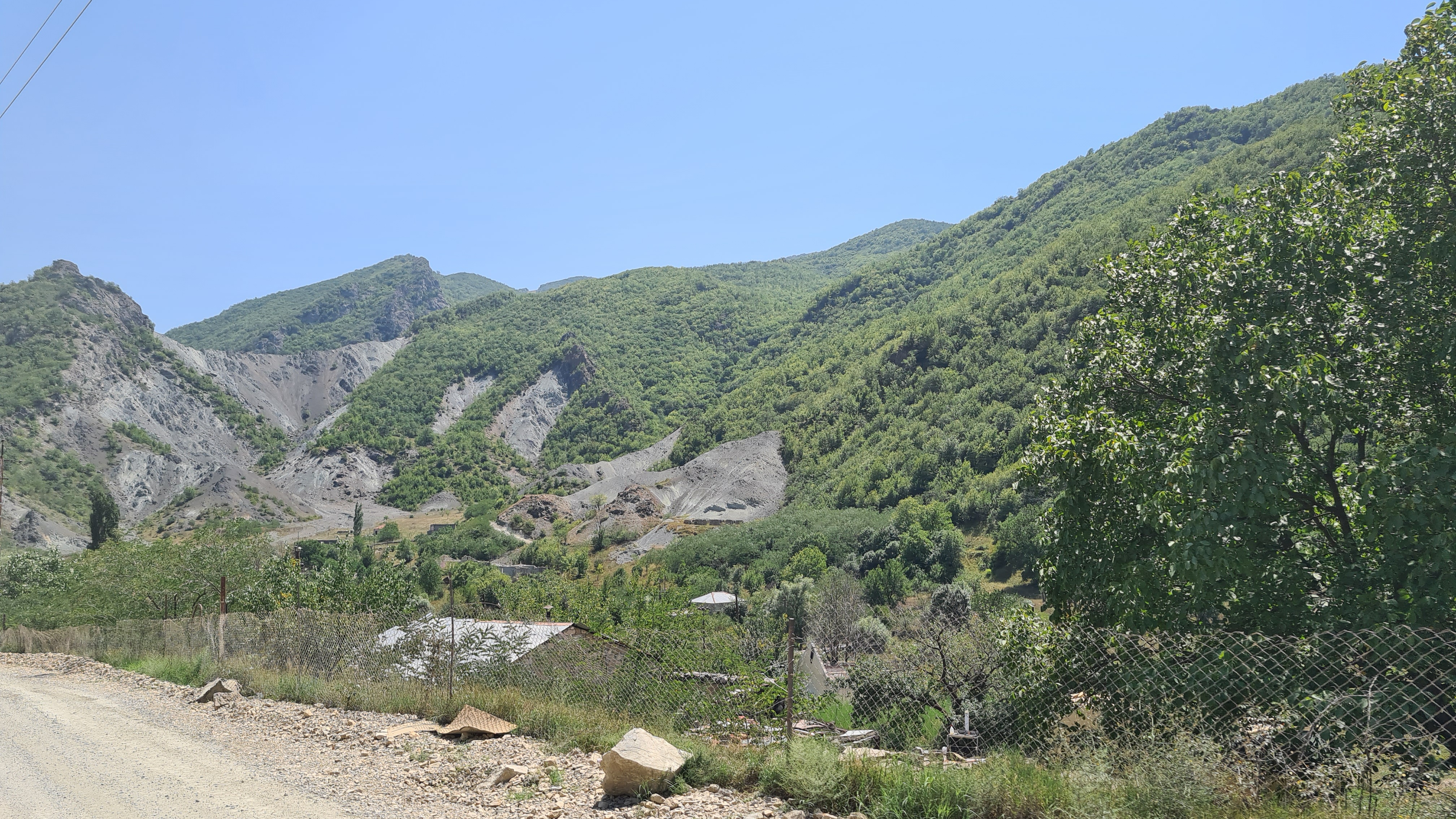

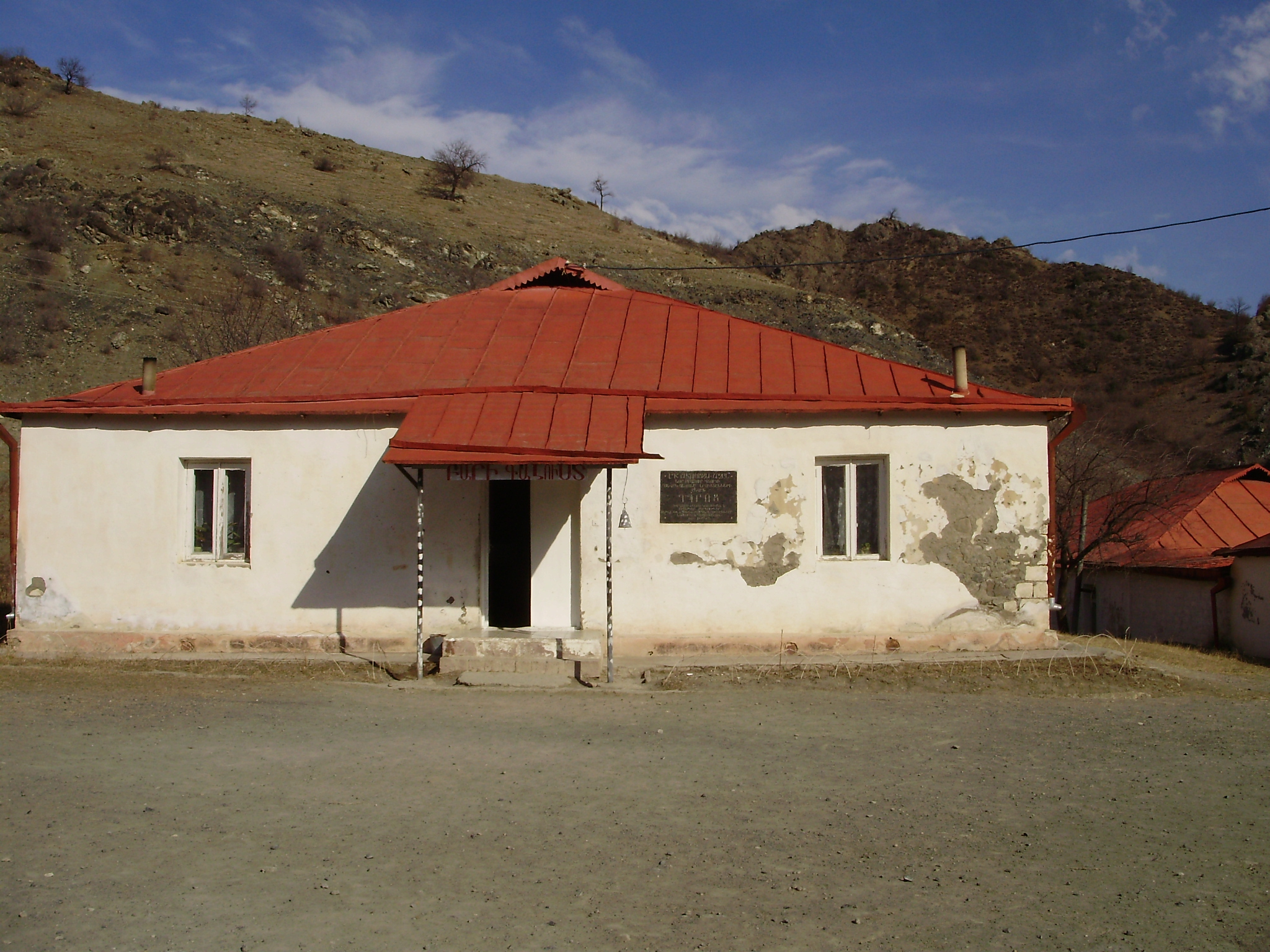

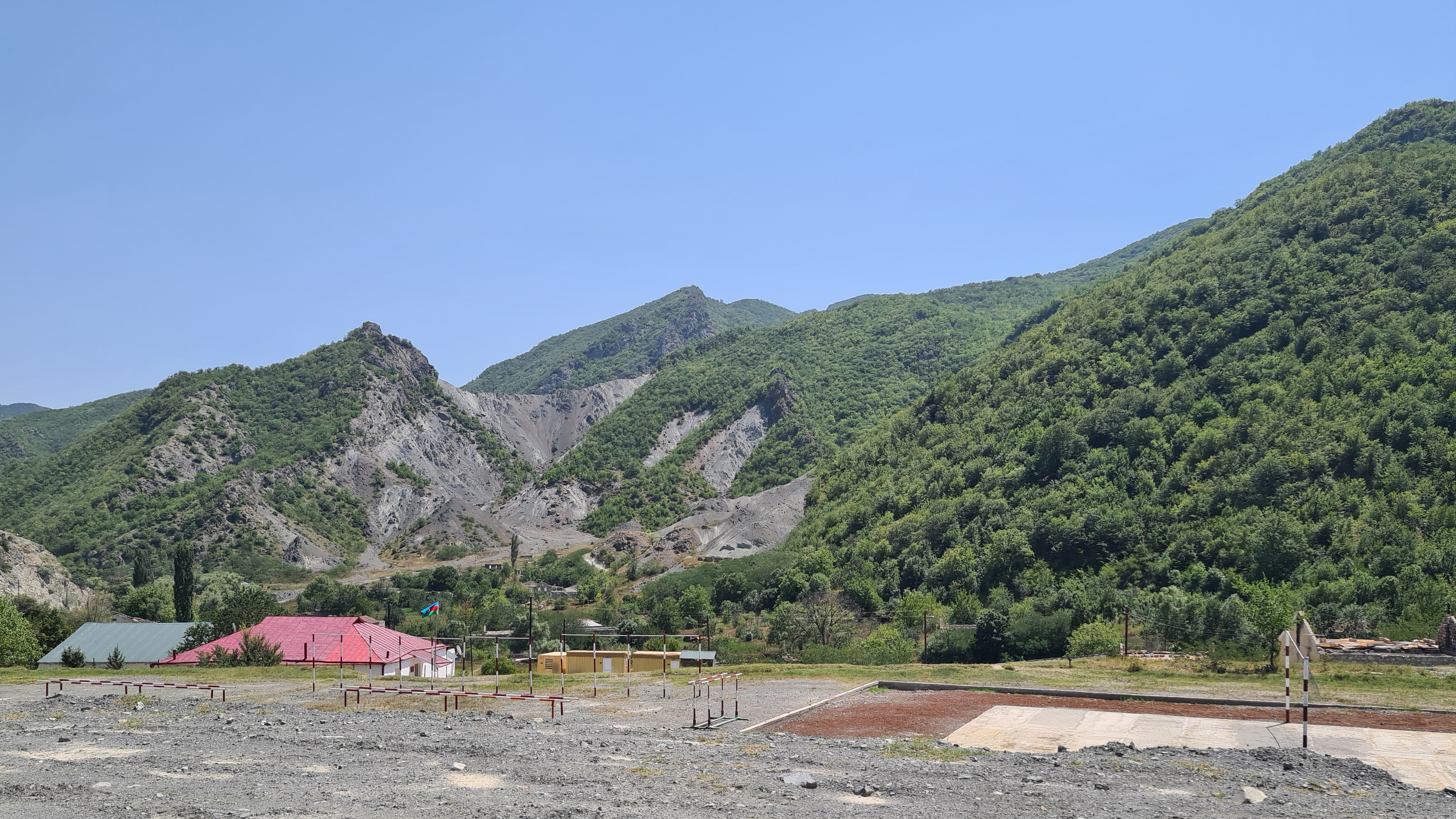
