= Elif Köroğlu =

Turkish football referee and long-distance runner

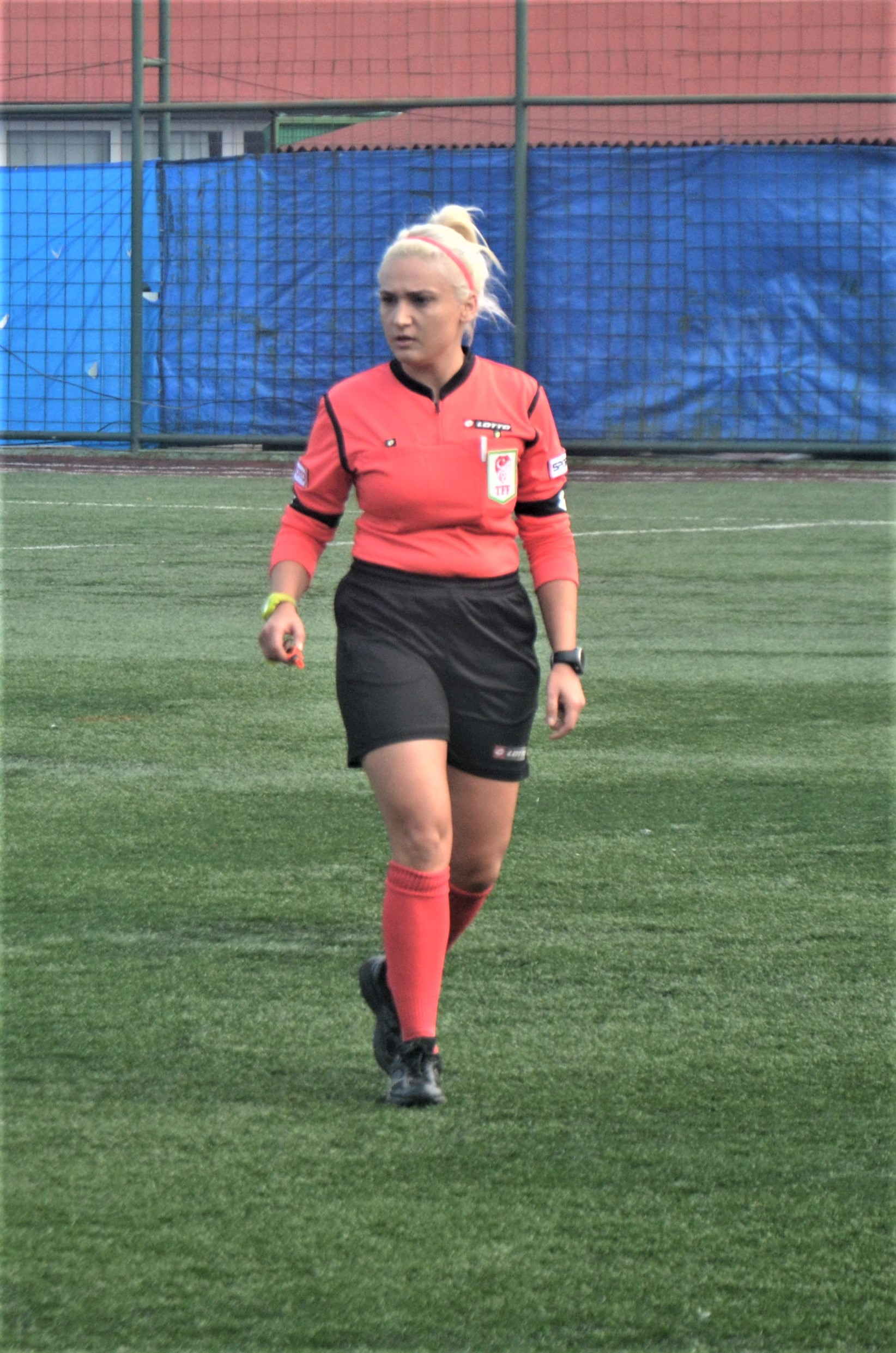
- Born: Turkey

Domestic
Years	League	Role
2016–2017	Amateur leagues for boys (U14, U15, U16, U17)	assistant referee
2017–	Amateur leagues for boys (U14, U15, U16, U17)	referee
2018–	Amateur leagues for boys (U19)	referee
2018–	Women's First League	referee

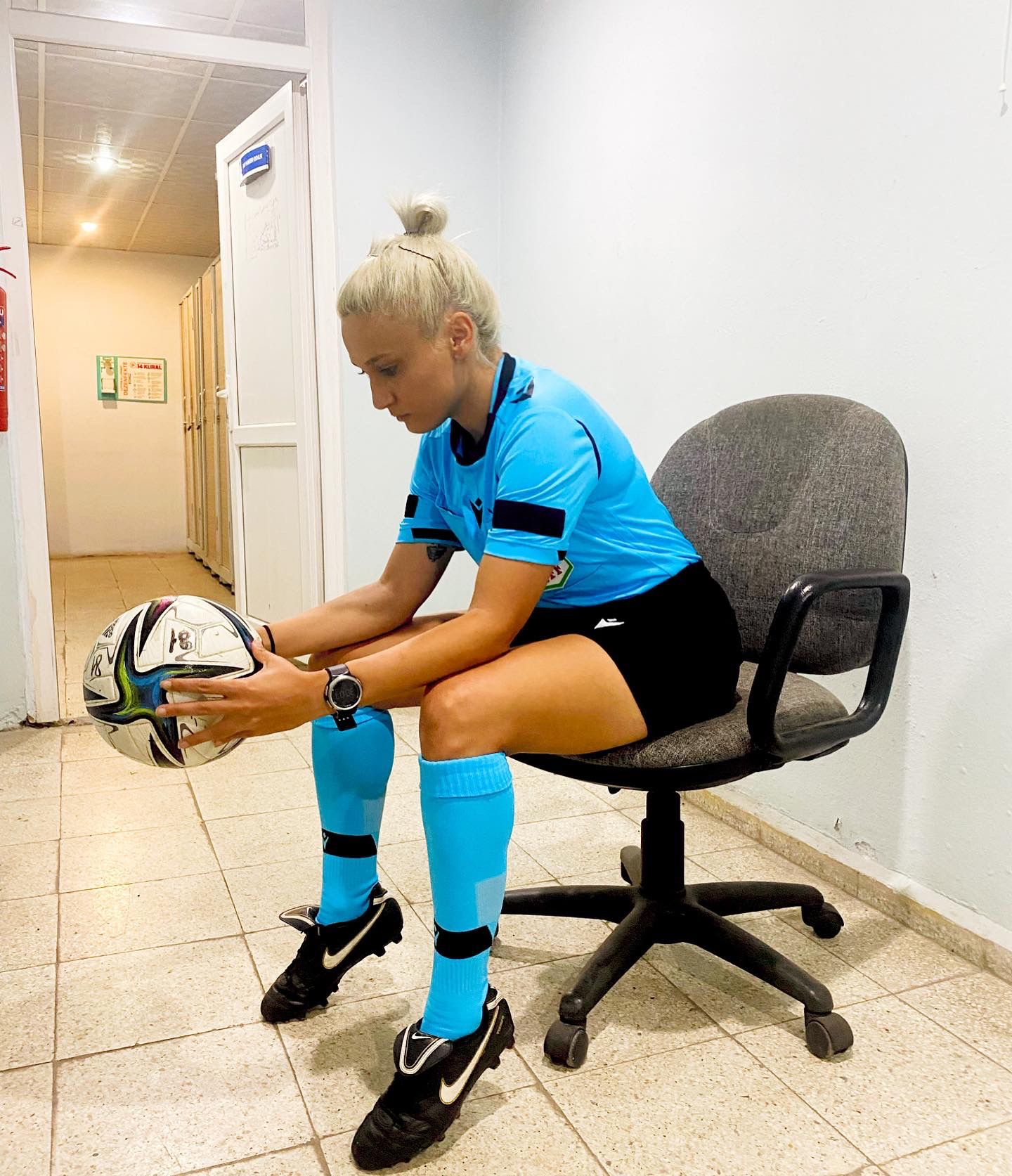
Elif Koroglu as referee

Elif Köroğlu is a Turkish female football referee and long-distance runner.

Elif Köroğlu began her official career in the amateur league match in March 2015. She served in the role of referee in various age categories of the amateur league between 2016 and 2017. In July 2017, she was promoted to the position of professional referee. She serves as a referee in the women's and men's professional leagues.

She started her athletics by running in the 4K meters branch. When she was only 14 years old, she ran 55.02 seconds and became third in Turkey. She then continued in the 400 meters branch. In 2013 she started running 5K, 10K, 15K, 25K, 21K and 42K. She has different championships in these branches as well.
