= Qılınclı, Lachin =

Qılınclı
- Location within Azerbaijan Location within East Zangezur Economic Region
- Coordinates: 39°41′40″N 46°22′25″E
- Country: Azerbaijan
- Rayon: Lachin
- Time zone: UTC+4 (AZT)
  - Summer (DST): UTC+5 (AZT)

Qılınclı (also, Qılışlı, Klychly, and Kylychly) is a village in the Lachin Rayon of Azerbaijan.
