= Azal branco =

Variety of grape

- Grape (Vitis)
- Color of berry skin: White
- Species: Vitis vinifera
- Also called: See list of synonyms
- Origin: Portugal
- Notable regions: Vinho Verde
- VIVC number: 815

Azal branco is a white Portuguese wine grape planted primarily in the Minho region but with greater expansion to Amarante, Basto, Baião and Vale do Sousa sub-regions. It noted for the high acidity of its wines, and is used for white Vinho Verde. Varietal Azal Branco wines can be somewhat reminiscent of Riesling.

Total Portuguese plantations are around 5,100 hectares (13,000 acres), which makes it the second-most planted grape variety of Minho, after Loureiro.

The Azal variety provides an intense green color when maturated and an aroma of citric fruits (such as lemon or green apple) and nuts. It produces young, fresh yet acidic wines.

== Synonyms ==
Azal branco is also known under the synonyms Asal branco, Asal da Lixa, Azal bianco, Azal da Lixa, Carvalha, Carvalhal, Es Pinheira, Gadelhudo, and Pinheira.

== See also ==
- Azal tinto
- List of Portuguese grape varieties
