= Nevşehir =

- Municipality
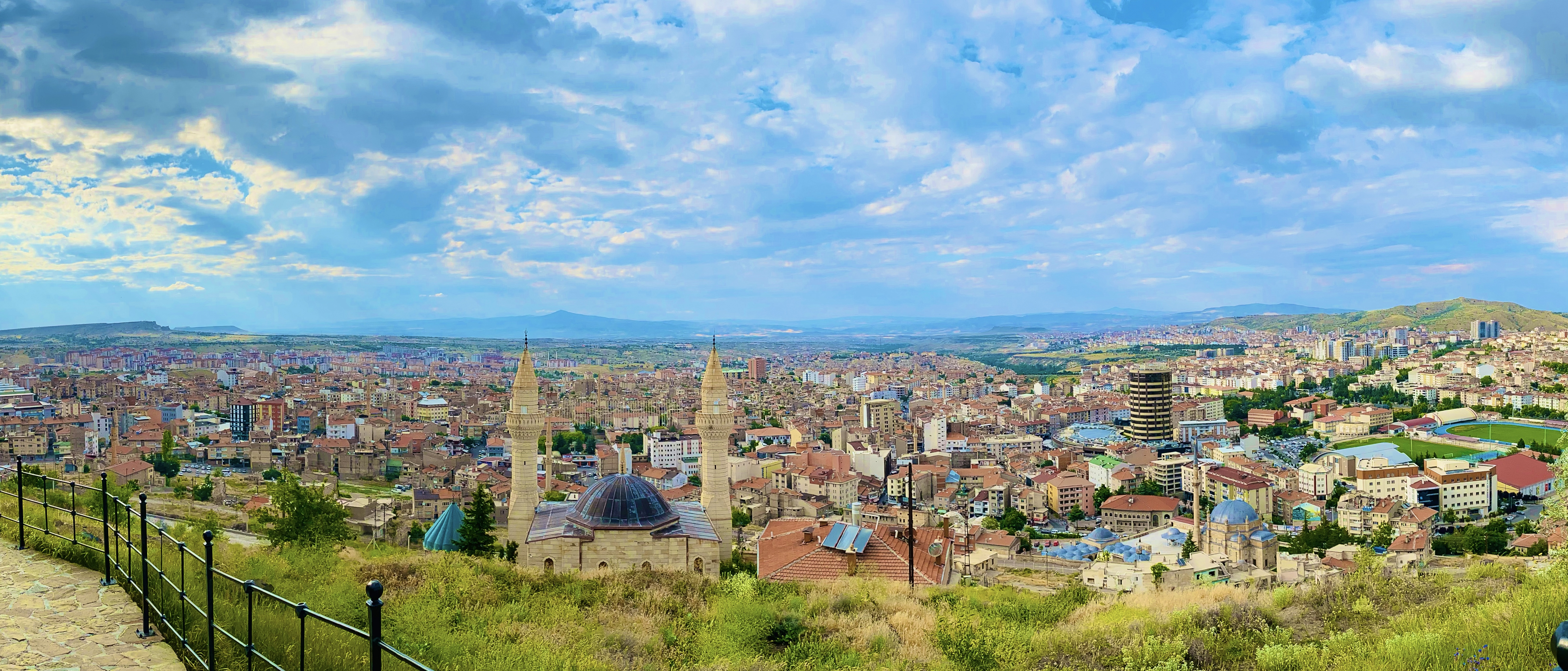
- Panoramic view from Nevşehir Castle

- Coat of arms

- Location within Turkey Location within Turkey Central Anatolia
- Coordinates: 38°37′35″N 34°42′50″E
- Country: Turkey
- Province: Nevşehir
- District: Nevşehir

Government
  - Mayor: Rasim Arı (AKP)
- Elevation: 1,224 m (4,016 ft)
- Population (2024): 128,290
- Time zone: UTC+3 (TRT)
- Postal code: 50300
- Area code: 0384
- Website: www.nevsehir.bel.tr

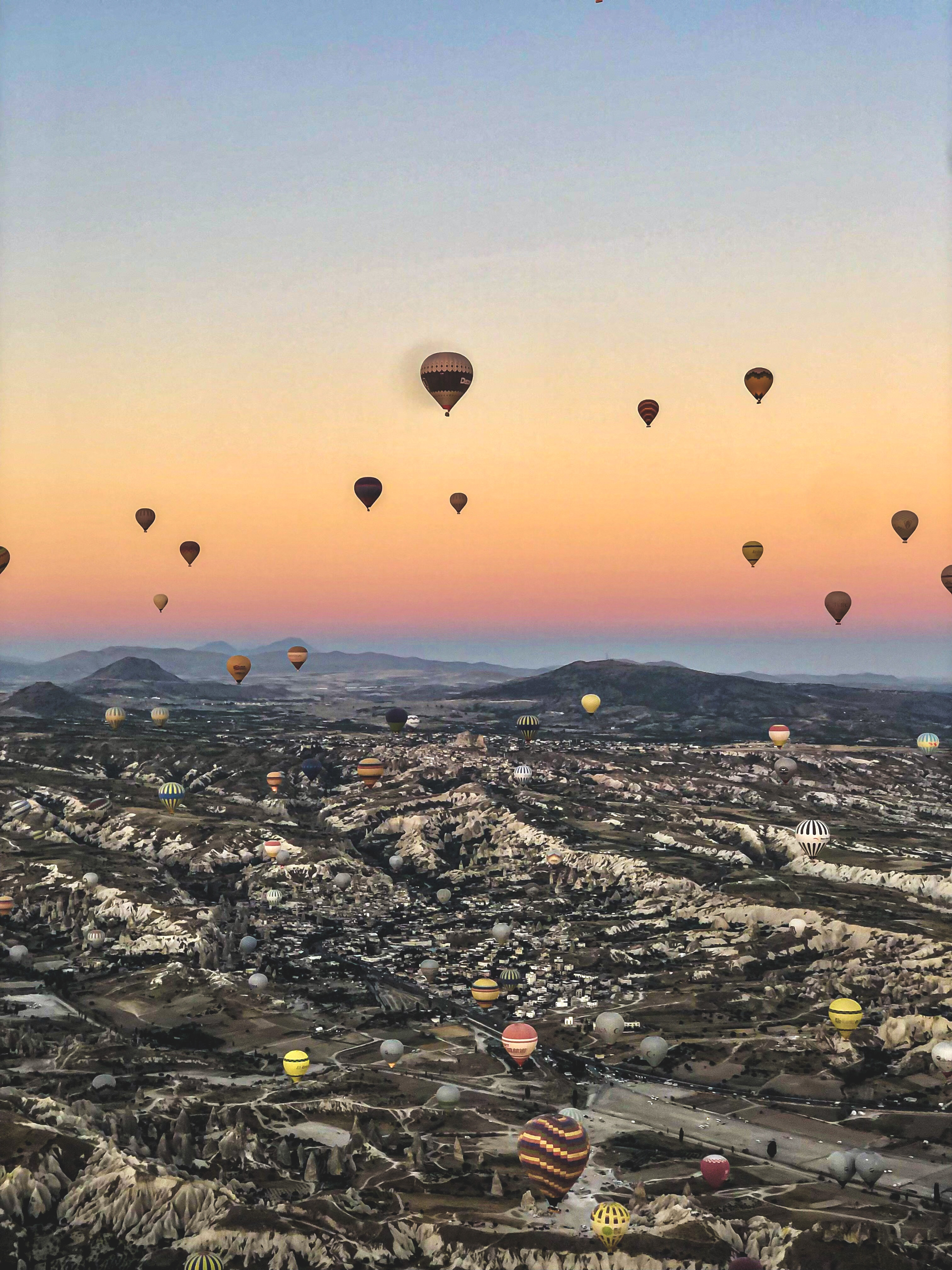
Hot Air Balloon in Nevsehir at Sunrise

Nevşehir (Turkish pronunciation: ['nevʃehiɾ]; from nev 'new' and şehir 'city') is a city in the Central Anatolia Region of Turkey. It is the seat of Nevşehir Province and Nevşehir District. Its population is 128,290 (2024). It is 290 km (180 mi) from the capital Ankara and lies within the historical region of Cappadocia. Nevşehir was declared a World Peace City by the United Nations.

The town lies at an elevation of 1,224 m (4,016 ft) and has a continental climate, with heavy snow in winter and great heat in summer. Although Nevşehir is close to the underground cities, fairy chimneys, monasteries, caravanserais and rock-hewn churches of Cappadocia, and has a few hotels, the modern town is not itself a tourist centre. In 2015 a huge underground city was discovered underneath its centre following demolition works intended to clear the central hillside of ramshackle modern housing.

Founded in 2007, Nevşehir University was renamed Nevşehir Hacı Bektaş Veli University in 2013. Cappadocia University is also located in Nevşehir.

Nevşehir Kapadokya Airport (NAV) is 30 kilometres northwest of the town. The inter-city bus station is about 6 km southwest of the city centre. Two planned high-speed rail services should eventually link Nevşehir to Antalya, Konya, Kayseri and Ankara.

== History ==
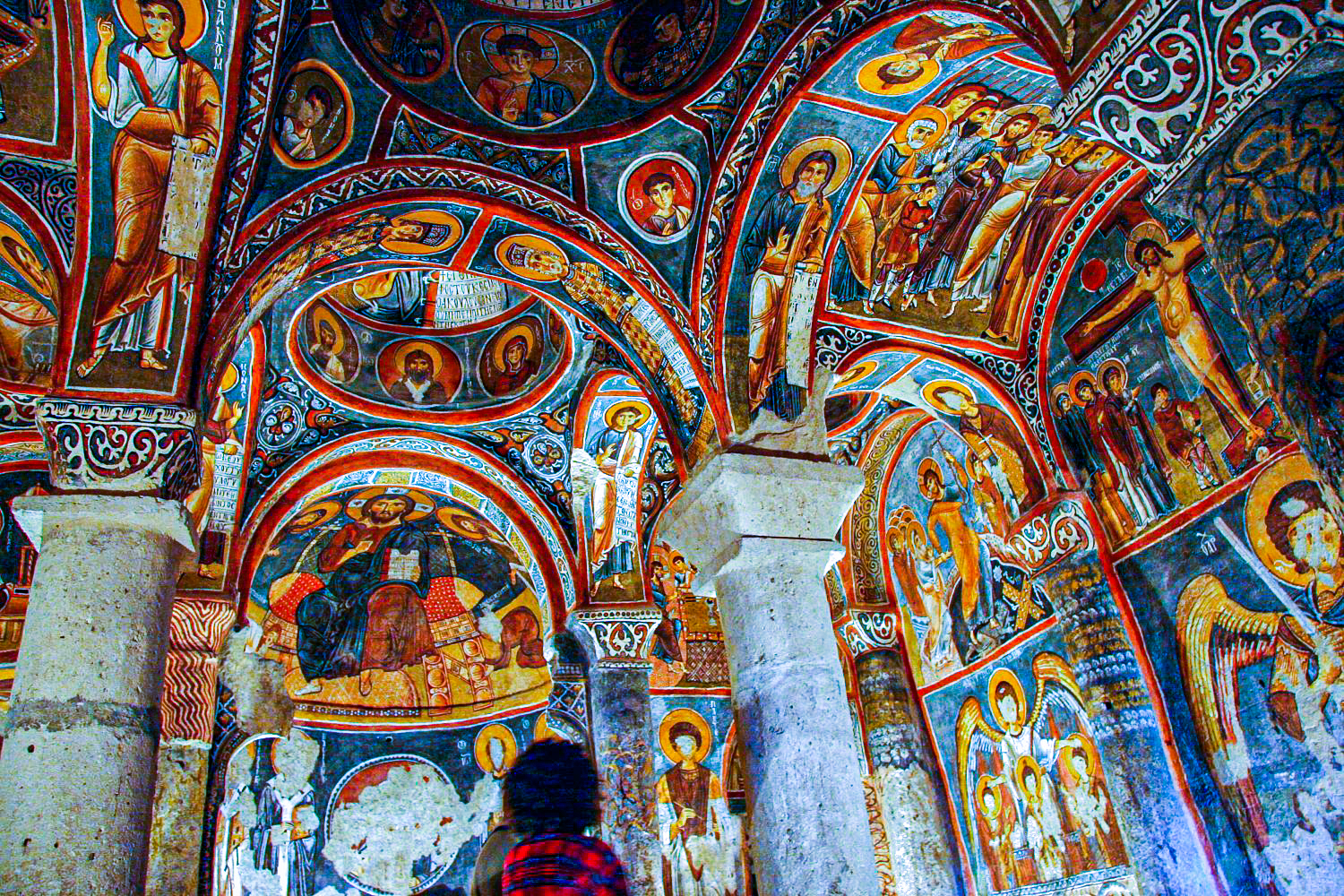
Frescos of Christ Pantocrator on the ceiling of the Karanlık Kilise in Göreme Open-Air Museum, near Nevşehir

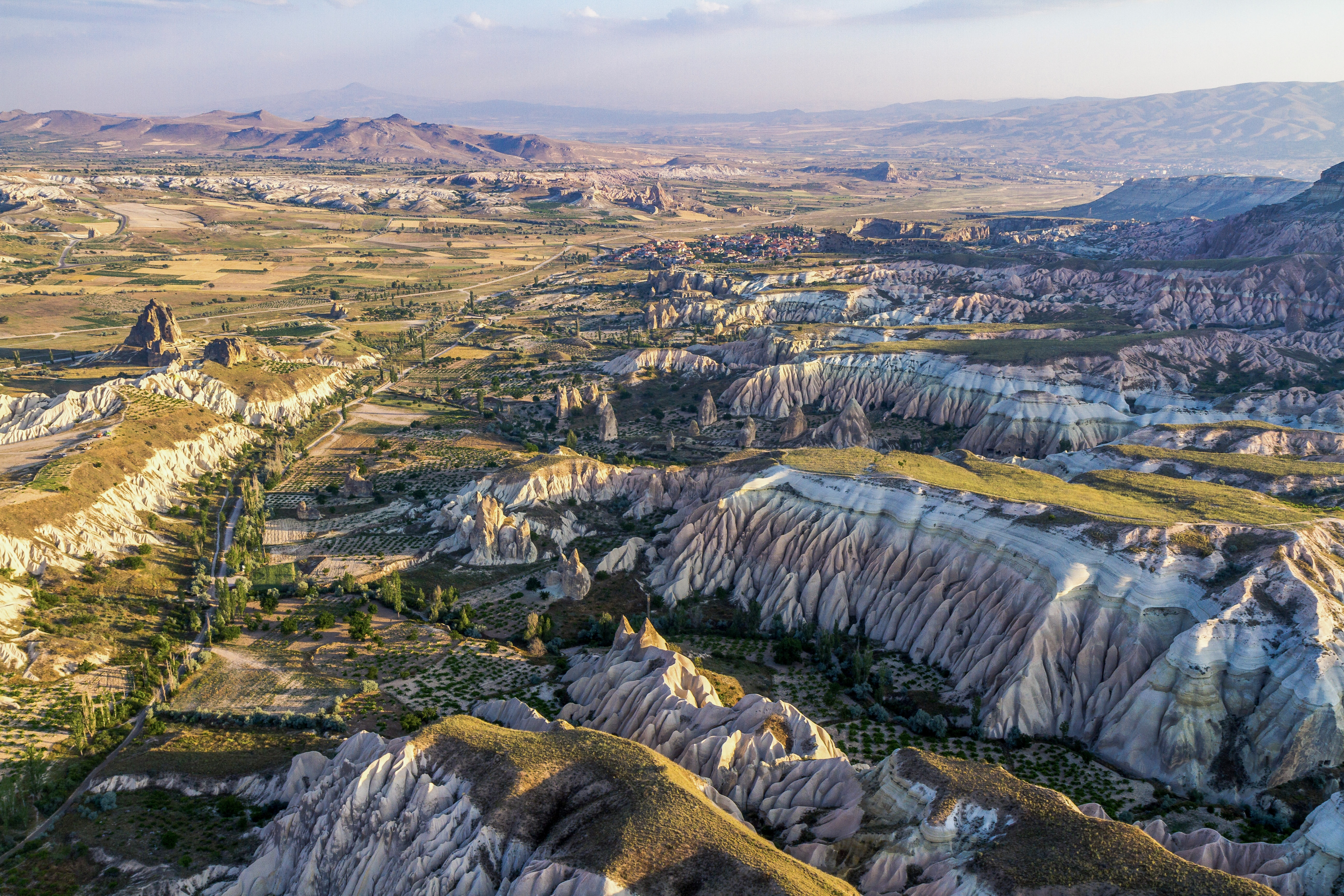
View of the Cappadocia landscape in Nevşehir province

=== Prehistory and ancient history ===
The Hittites first founded the settlement of Nissa on the slopes of Mount Kahveci, located in the present-day settlement of Nar, in the valley of Kızılırmak (the ancient Halys). The settlement was later known as Soanda and Seandos. This town, along with the region, came under the rule of the Assyrian Empire around the 8th century BC, and was subsequently ruled by the Medes and then by the Persians during the reign of emperor Cyrus the Great in 546 BC. In 333 BC, Alexander the Great defeated the Persians and after his death, the surrounding area came under the rule of the dynasty of Ariarathes with Mazaka (present-day Kayseri) as its capital. The Cappadocian kingdom became a province- of the Roman empire in the reign of Emperor Tiberius.

=== Medieval history ===
The so-called underground cities found around Nevşehir may originally have been built to escape persecution by the pagan Roman authorities although others believe they date back to Hittite times. Many of the churches, hewn in the rocks, date from these early years of Christianity. Even when Theodosius I made Christianity the official religion of the empire, the caves offered protection for the local people during raids by the Sassanid Persians circa AD 604 and by the Islamic Caliphate from AD 647 onwards. When Iconoclasm became state policy in the Byzantine empire, again the caves around Nevşehir became shelters for those escaping persecution.

The castle on the hill in the middle of Nevşehir dates from the Byzantine period, when the region was on the frontline in the (holy) wars against the Islamic Caliphate.

At the Battle of Manzikert (present-day Malazgirt) in AD 1071, the Byzantine emperor Romanos IV was defeated by the Seljuk Sultan Alp Arslan which led to the occupation of Anatolia by the Seljuks by 1074. Along with the rest of the region, Nevşehir became part of the Seljuk Sultanate of Rum, then fell under the rule of the Karamanid dynasty in 1328 and finally under Ottoman rule around 1487 AD when it was renamed Muşkara. It remained relatively insignificant until the early 18th century.

=== Modern history ===
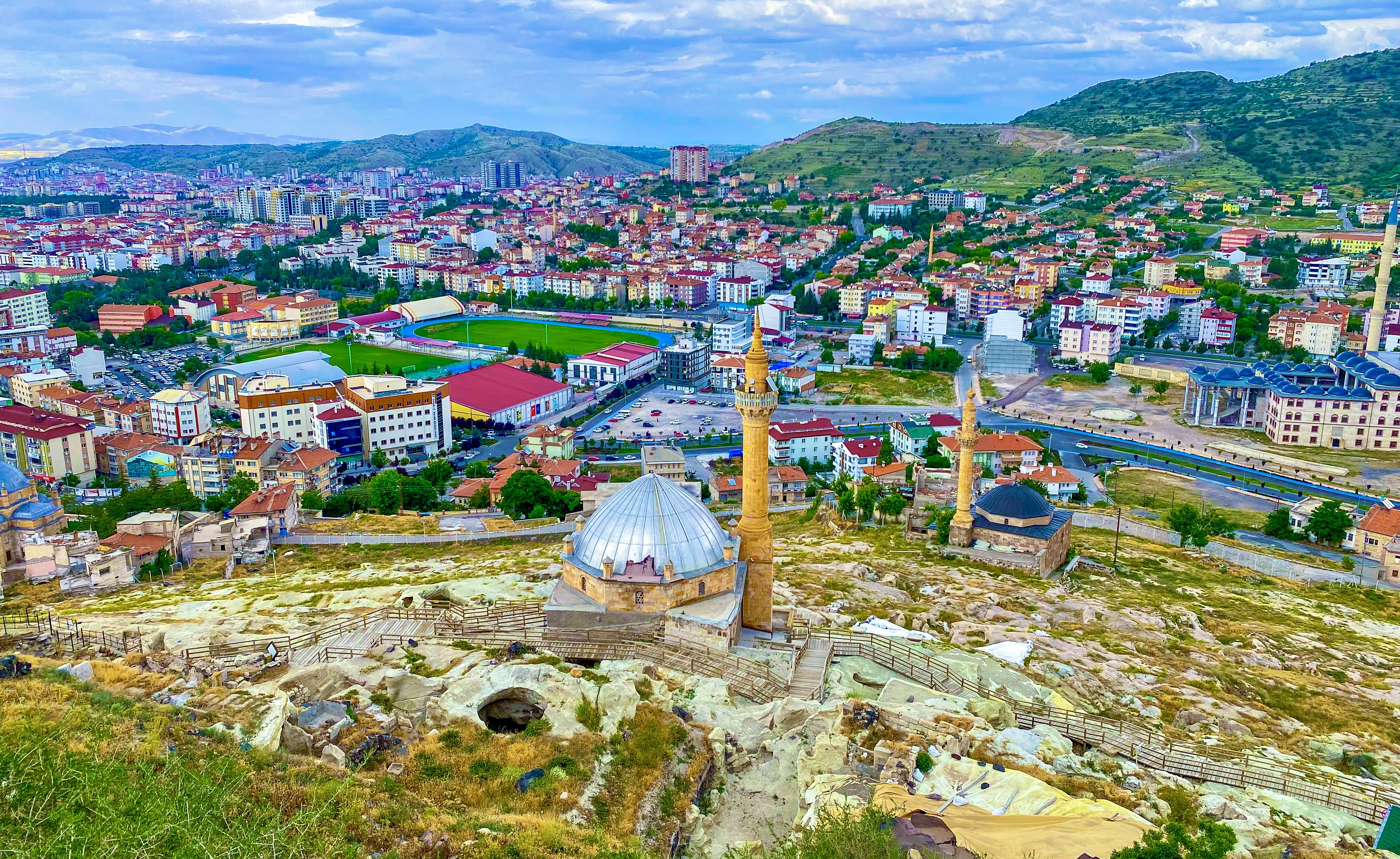
Kayaşehir and the surrounding seen from Nevşehir Castle

The present-day city owes its foundation in the so-called Tulip Age to the grand vizier and son-in-law of the Sultan Ahmed III, Nevşehirli Damad İbrahim Pasha who was born in Muşkara and later took a great interest in its expansion. The small village with only 18 houses, formerly under the administration of the kaza of Ürgüp, was rapidly transformed with the building of mosques (the Kurṣunlu Mosque), fountains, schools, soup kitchens, inns and bath houses, and its name was changed from Muşkara to "Nevşehir" (meaning New City in Persian and Ottoman Turkish). In 1730 the grand vizier was assassinated by rebels in İstanbul but by then Nevşehir was firmly established as a town.

According to the Ottoman General Census of 1881/82-1893, the kaza of Nevşehir had a total population of 39,822, consisting of 30,370 Muslims, 8,918 Greeks, 477 Armenians, 36 Catholics and 21 Protestants.

Under the terms of the Convention Concerning the Exchange of Greek and Turkish Populations in 1923, the Greek Orthodox community of Nevşehir was exchanged for Muslims from Osiani, Siaki and Revani villages of Kastoria in Western Macedonia, Greece.

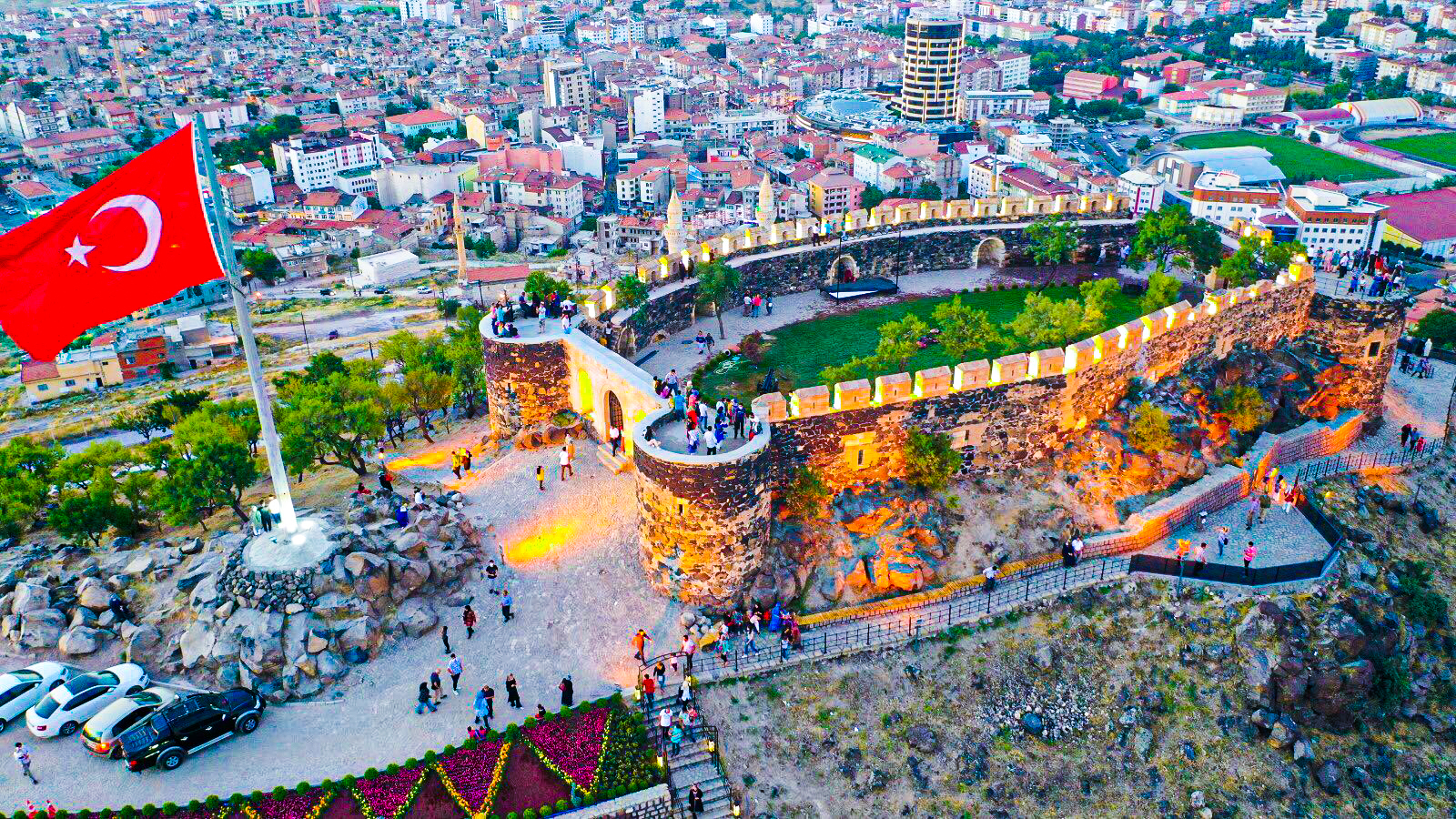
Aerial view over Nevşehir Castle

== Economy ==
The economy of Nevşehir is largely characterized by agriculture as well as tourism.

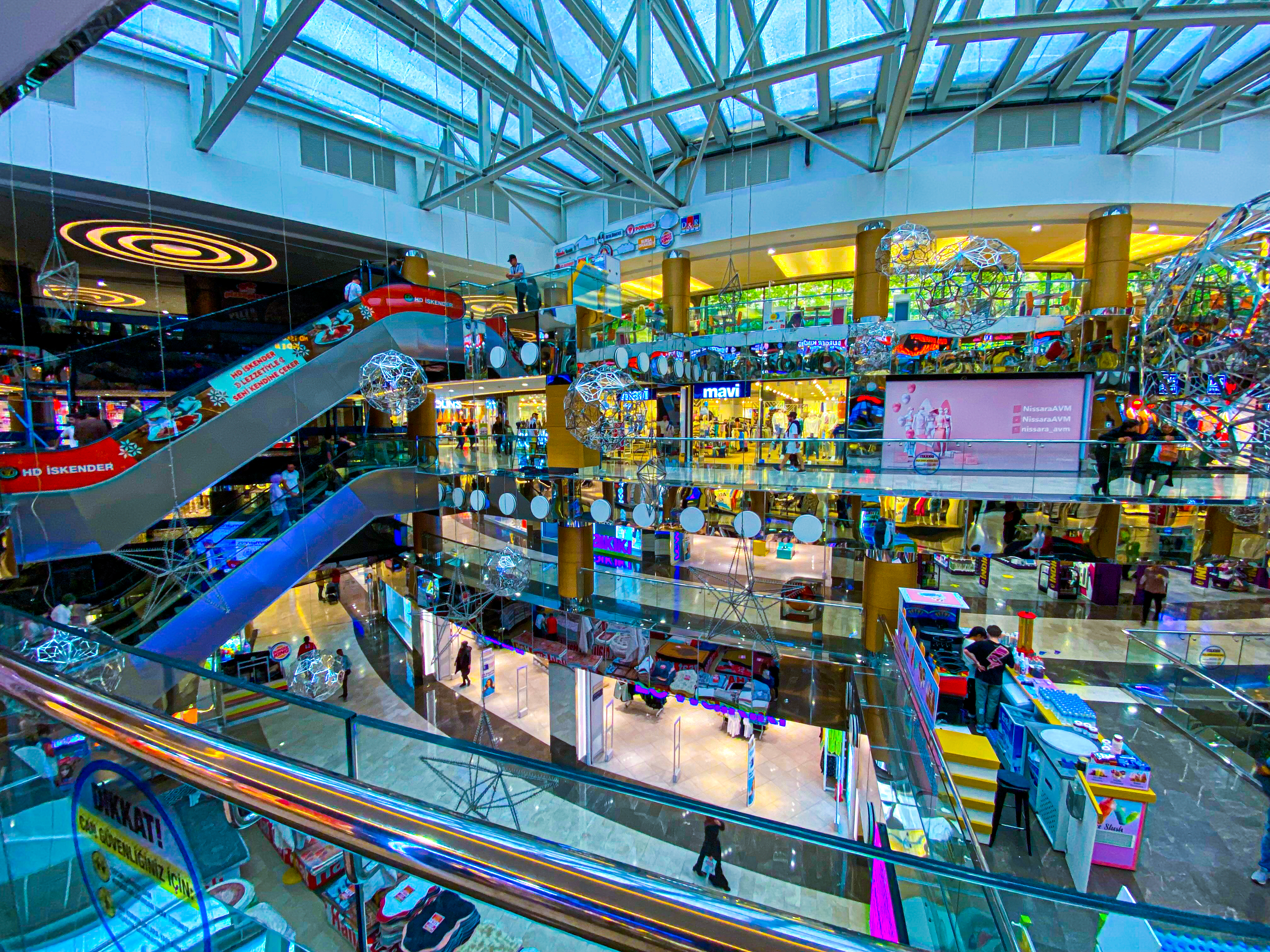
Nissara AVM, the main shopping centre in the city of Nevşehir

== Sightseeing ==
=== In town ===
- Kurşunlu Mosque, a unique early 17th-century mosque in the city centre which contains elements of Ottoman and Tulip period architecture.
- Nevşehir Castle and Kayaşehir
- Meryem Ana Kilisesi, Mother Mary Church near Nevşehir Castle
- The Hagios Georgios Church, also known as the 'Çanlı Church' near Nevşehir Castle
- Green Valley - dotted with restaurants and gardens near Nar
- Nevşehir Veterans Stadium
- Nevşehir Football Stadium

=== Around town ===
- Uçhisar, a rock-cut castle in Cappadocia.
- Churches of Göreme
- Ortahisar Castle located in the Ürgüp district.
- The Kızılırmak River and the tourist bridge passing through the Avanos town center.
- Open Palace Museum located in the Gülşehir district.
- Temenni Hill and the Three Beauties fairy chimneys in the Ürgüp district.
- Derinkuyu underground city.
- Cappadocia valleys and historical mansions.
- Mustafapaşa village in Ürgüp district.
- Çavuşin and Zelve regions in Avanos district.

== Gallery ==
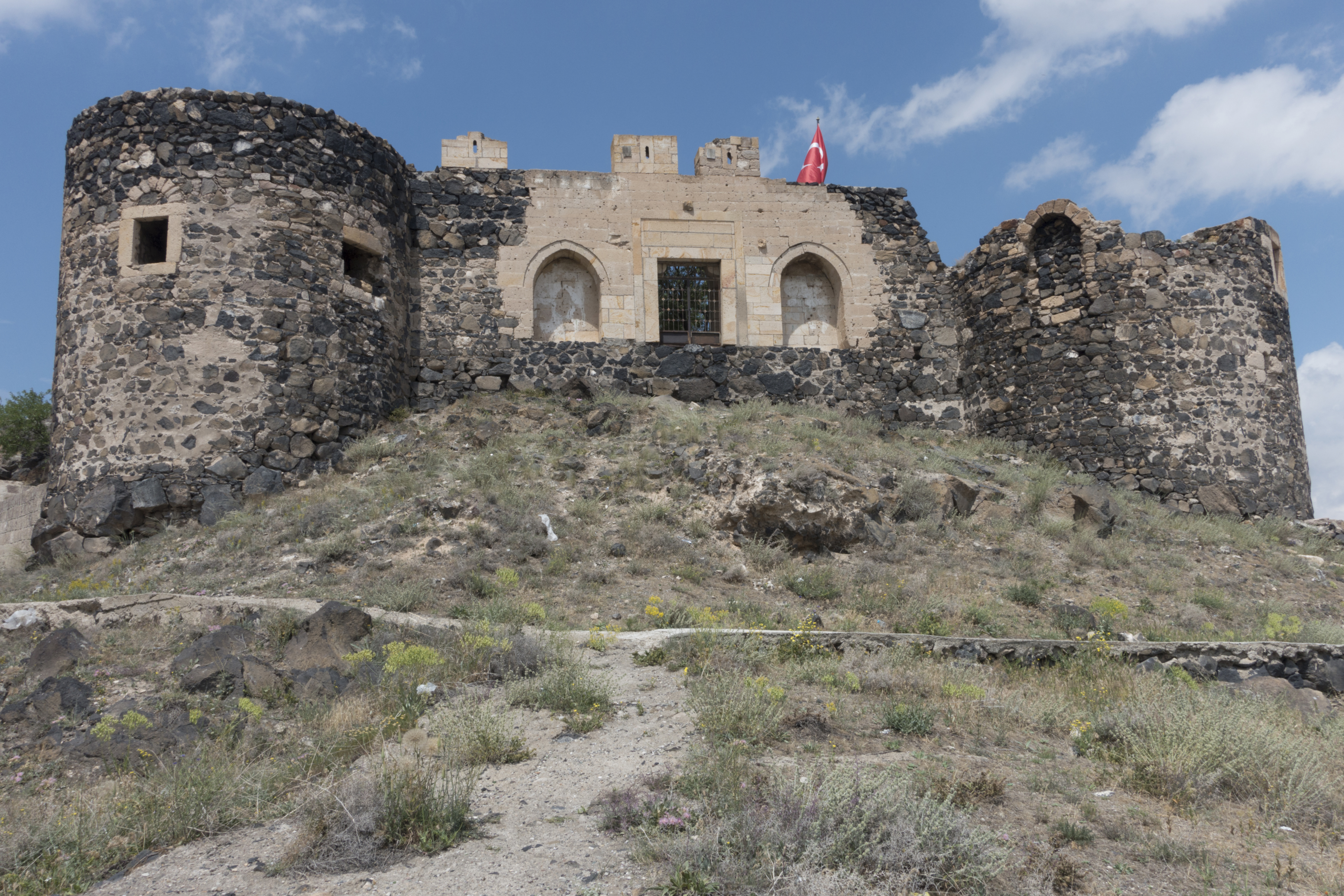
Nevşehir Castle from exterior

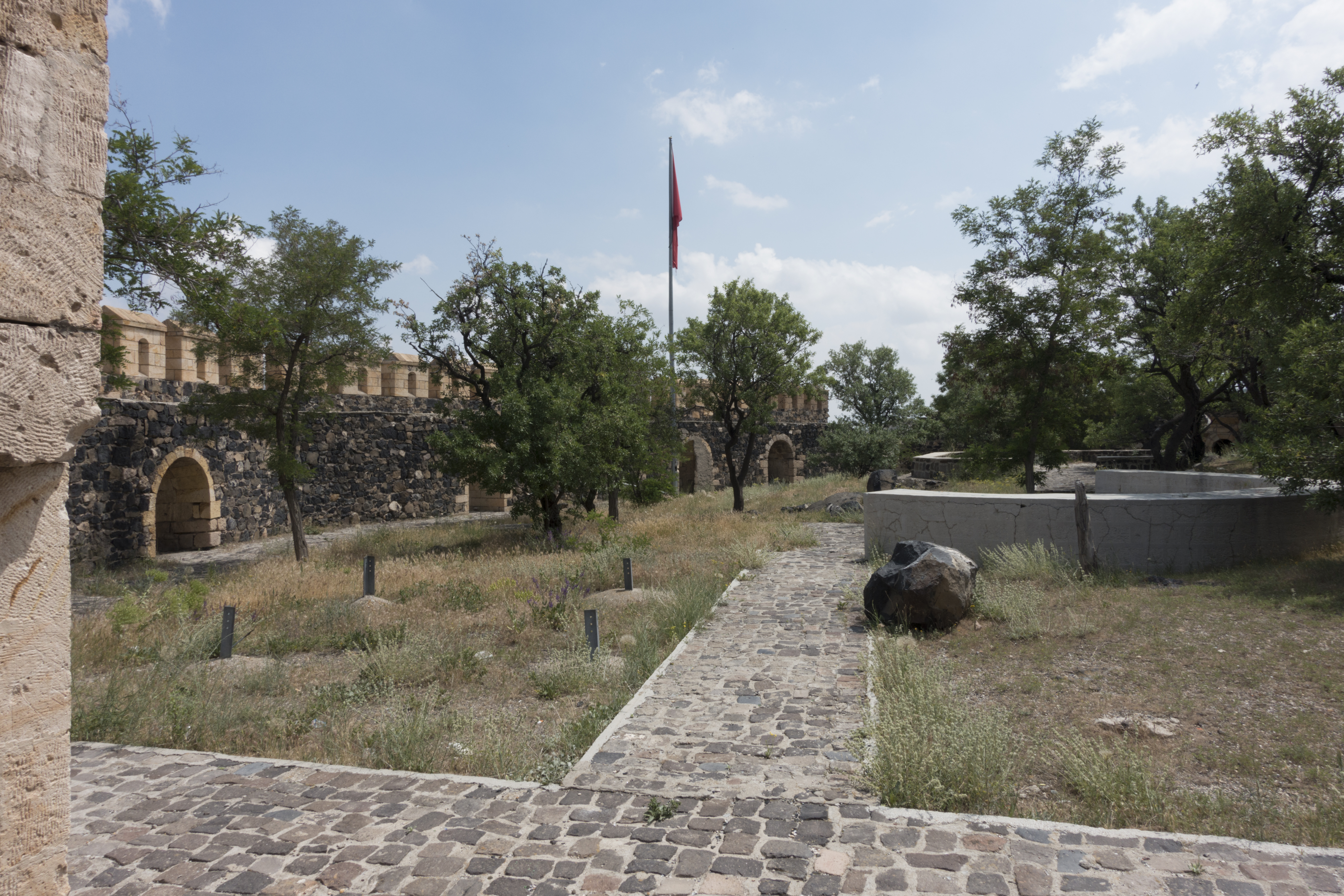
Interior of Nevsehir Castle

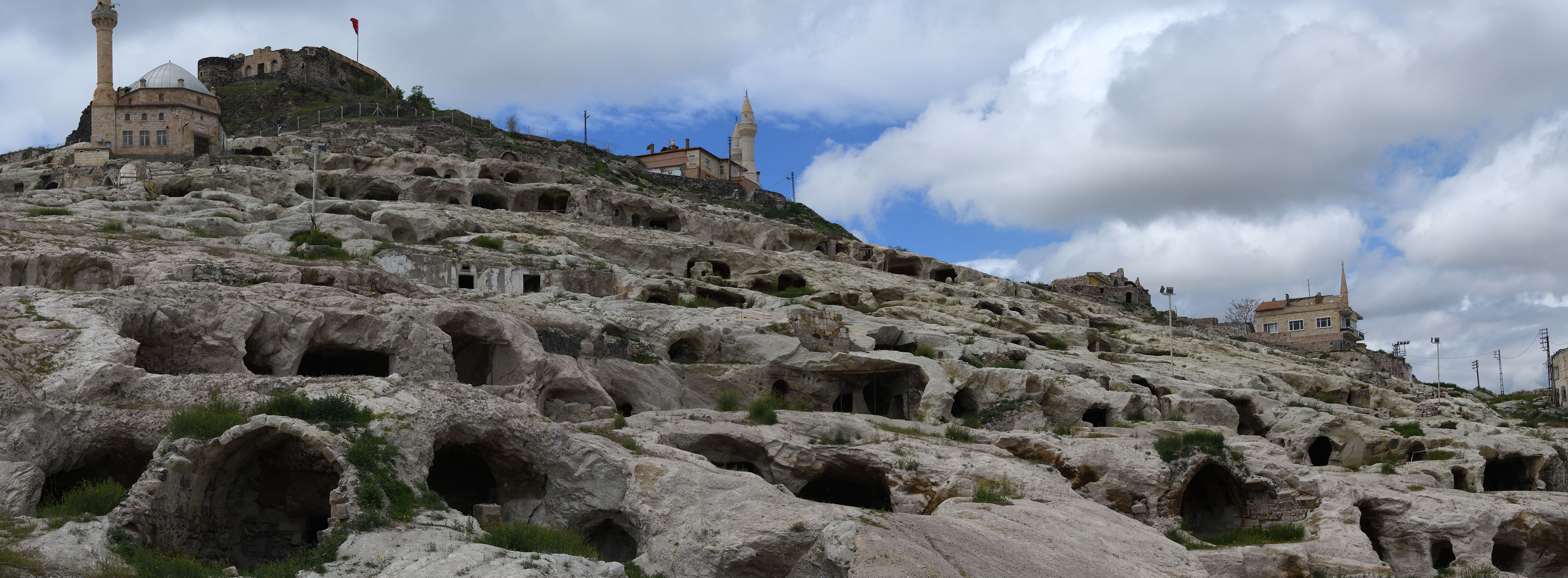
Nevşehir Castle above the underground city discovered in 2015

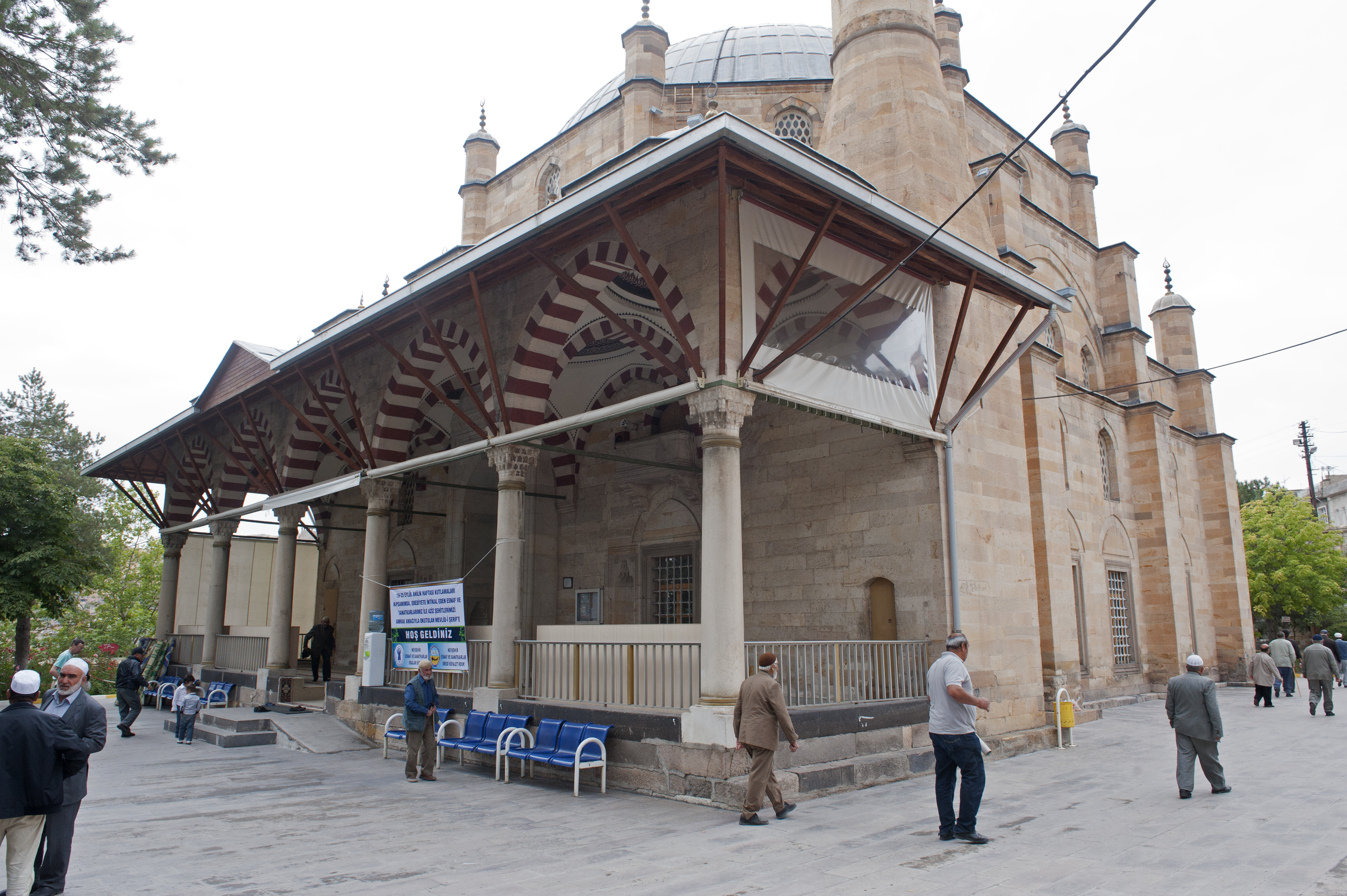
18th-century Damat Ibrahim Pasha mosque complex

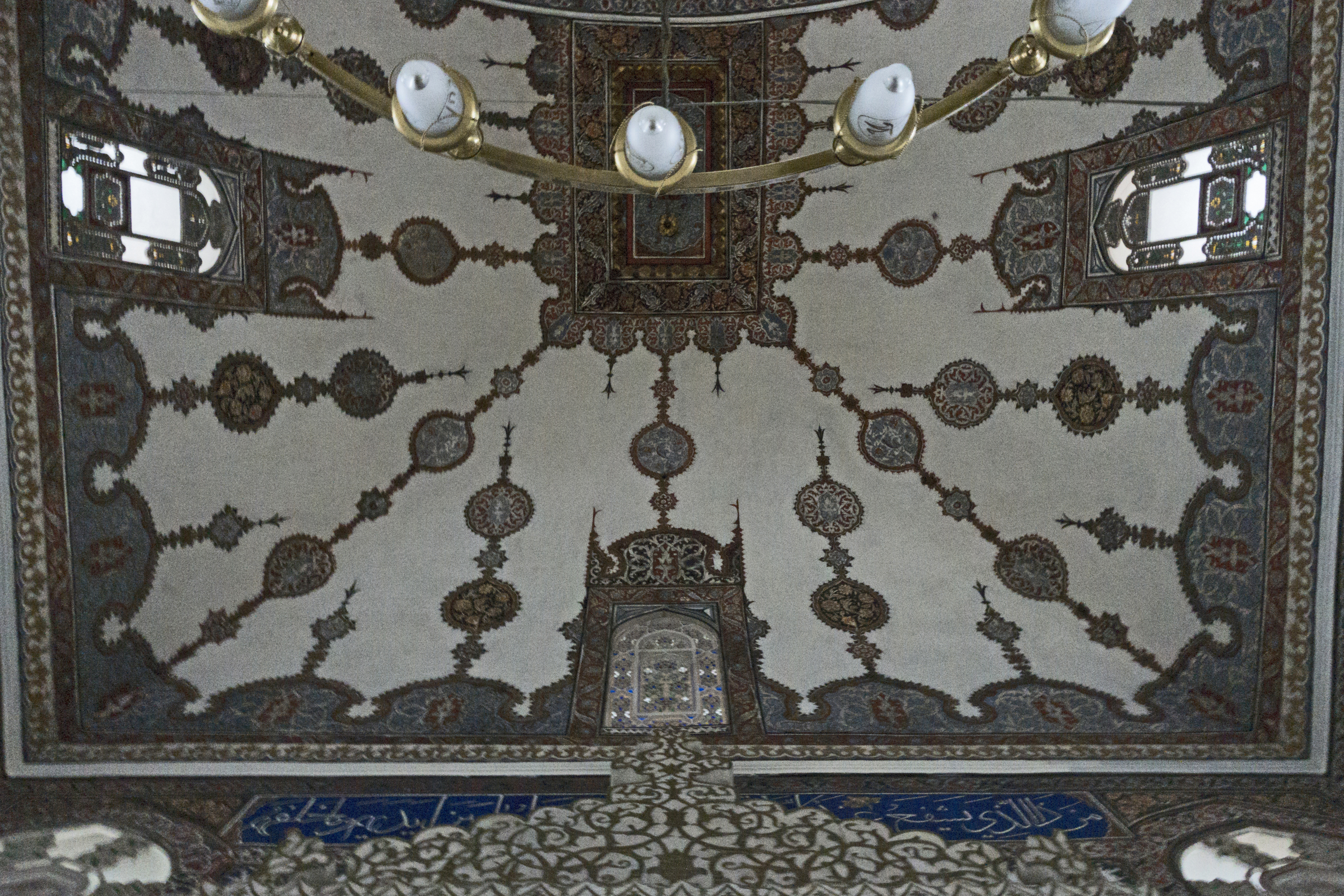
Interior of Damat Ibrahim Pasha Mosque

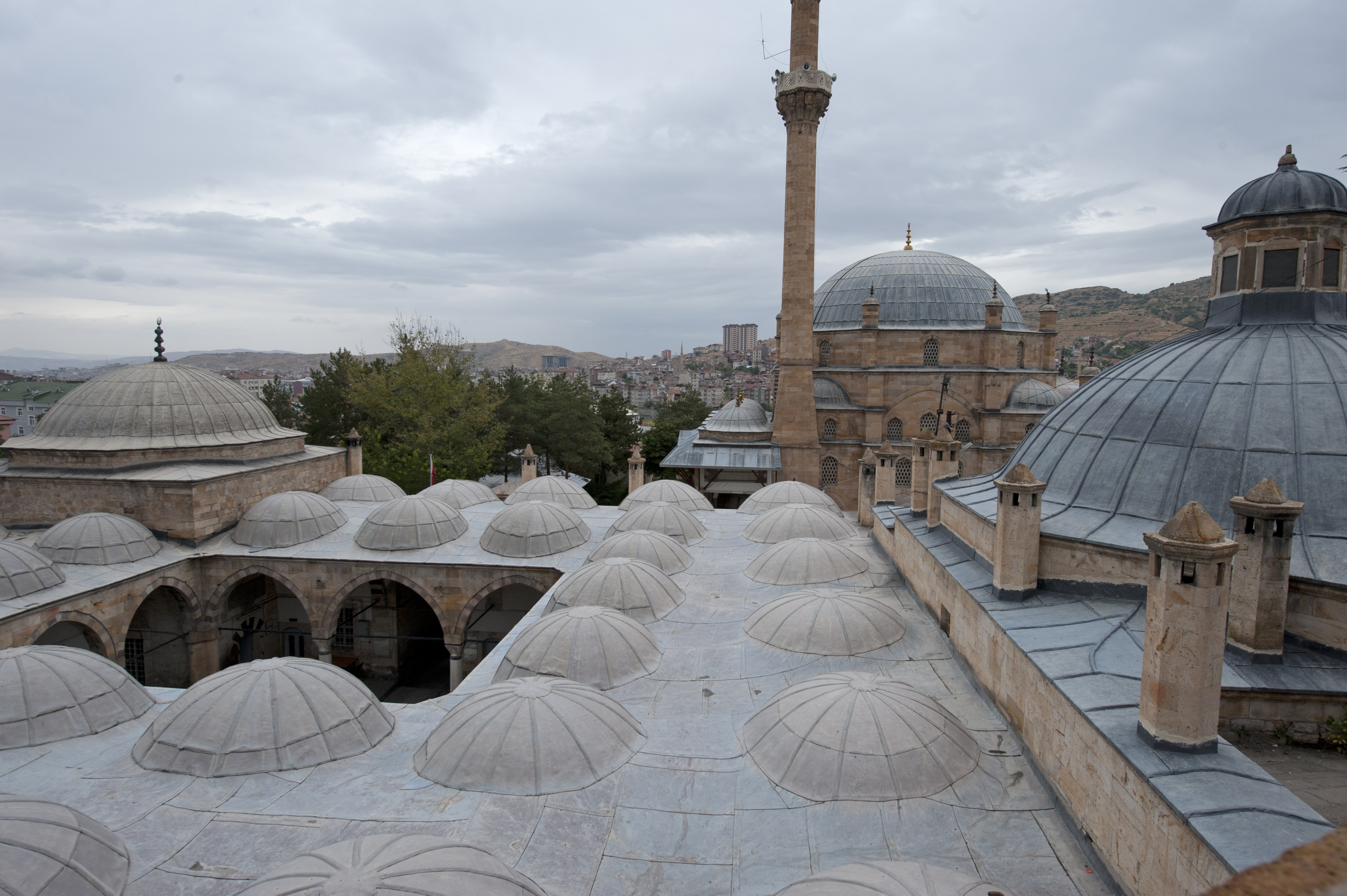
Nevşehir's Damat Ibrahim Pasha complex includes a hamam

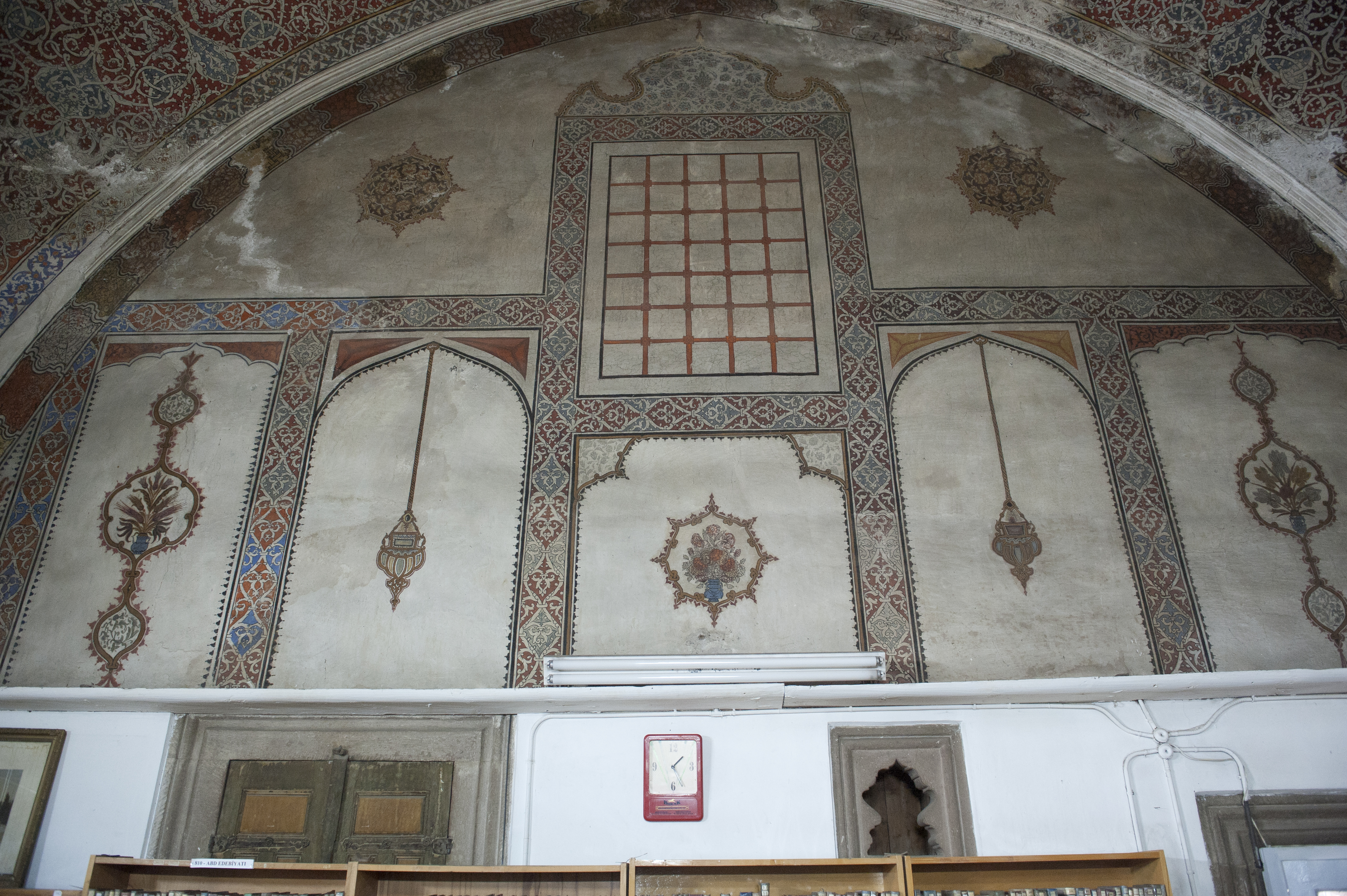
Medrese of Damat Ibrahim Pasha mosque complex

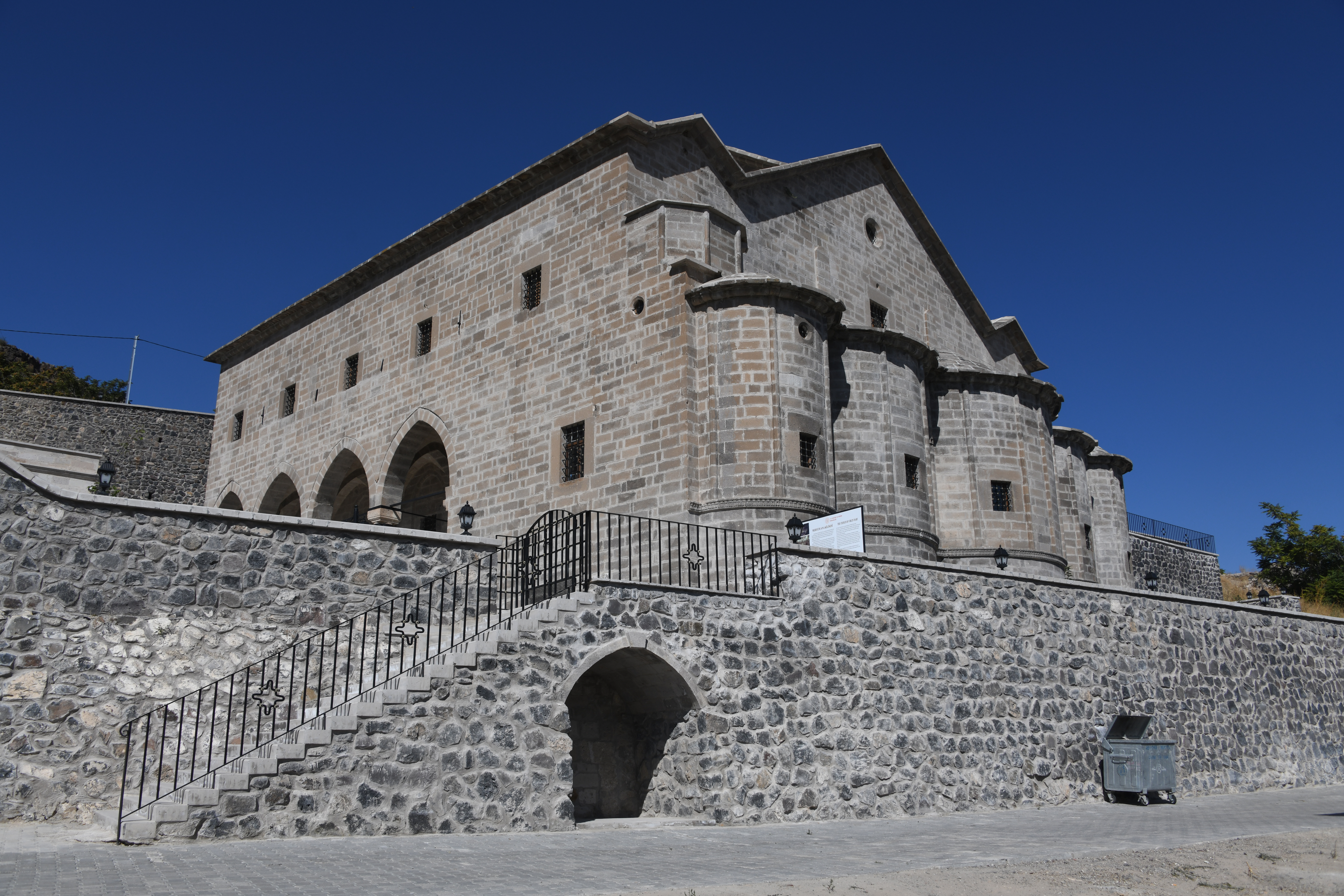
The recently restored Church of the Virgin Mary in Nevşehir

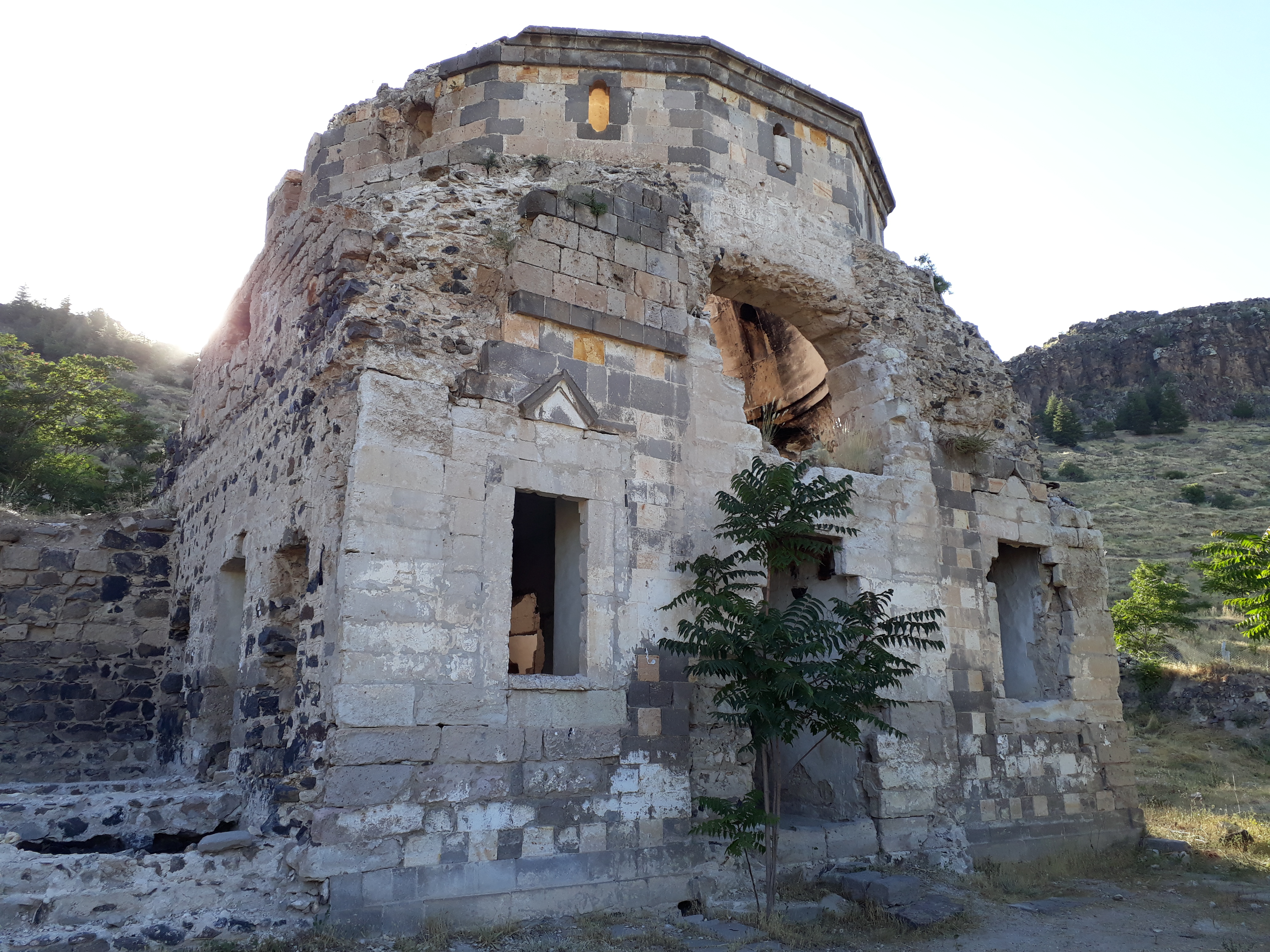
Greek (Rum) bathhouse in Nevşehir

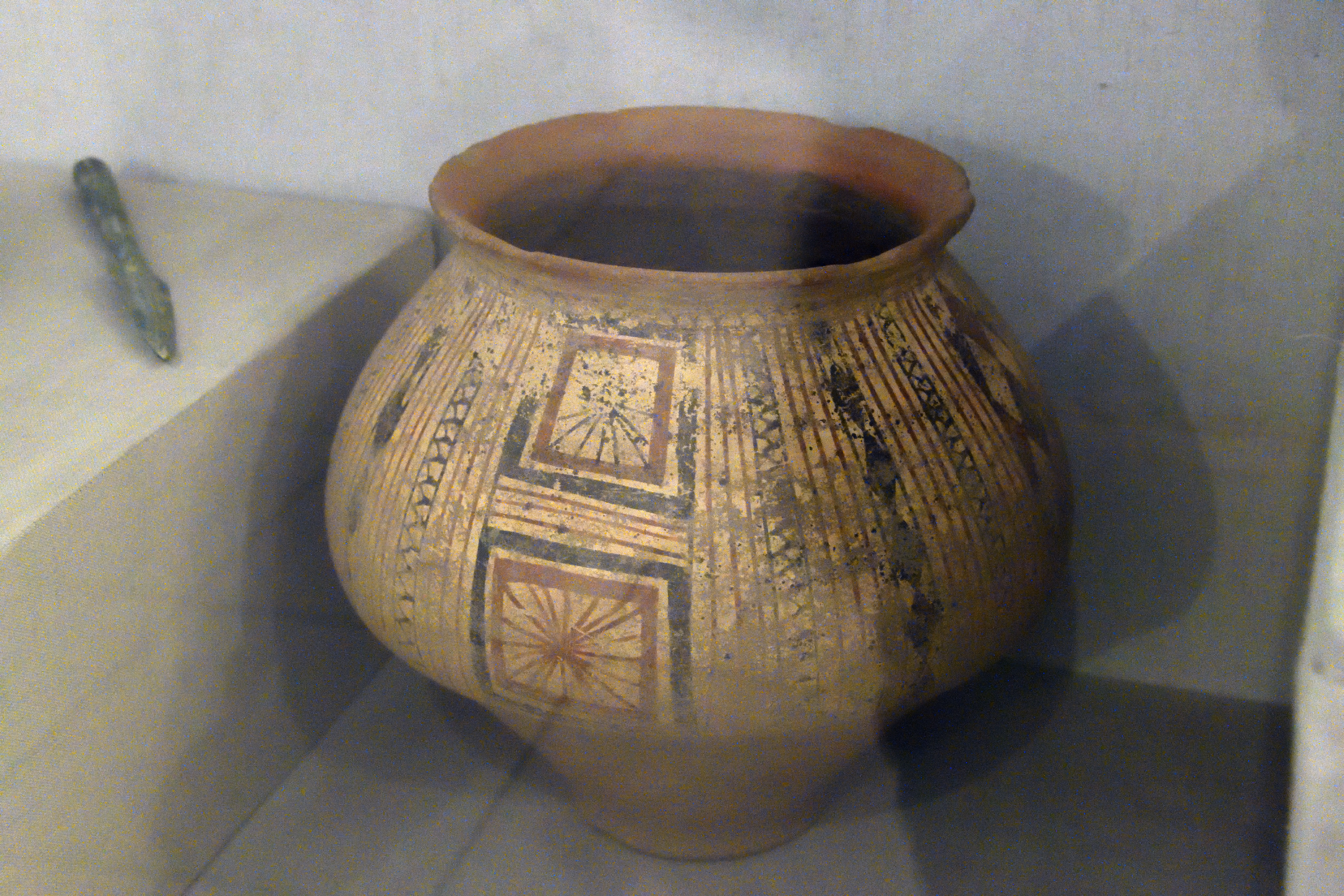
Nevşehir Museum: Middle Bronze Age pot, 2000-1200 BC

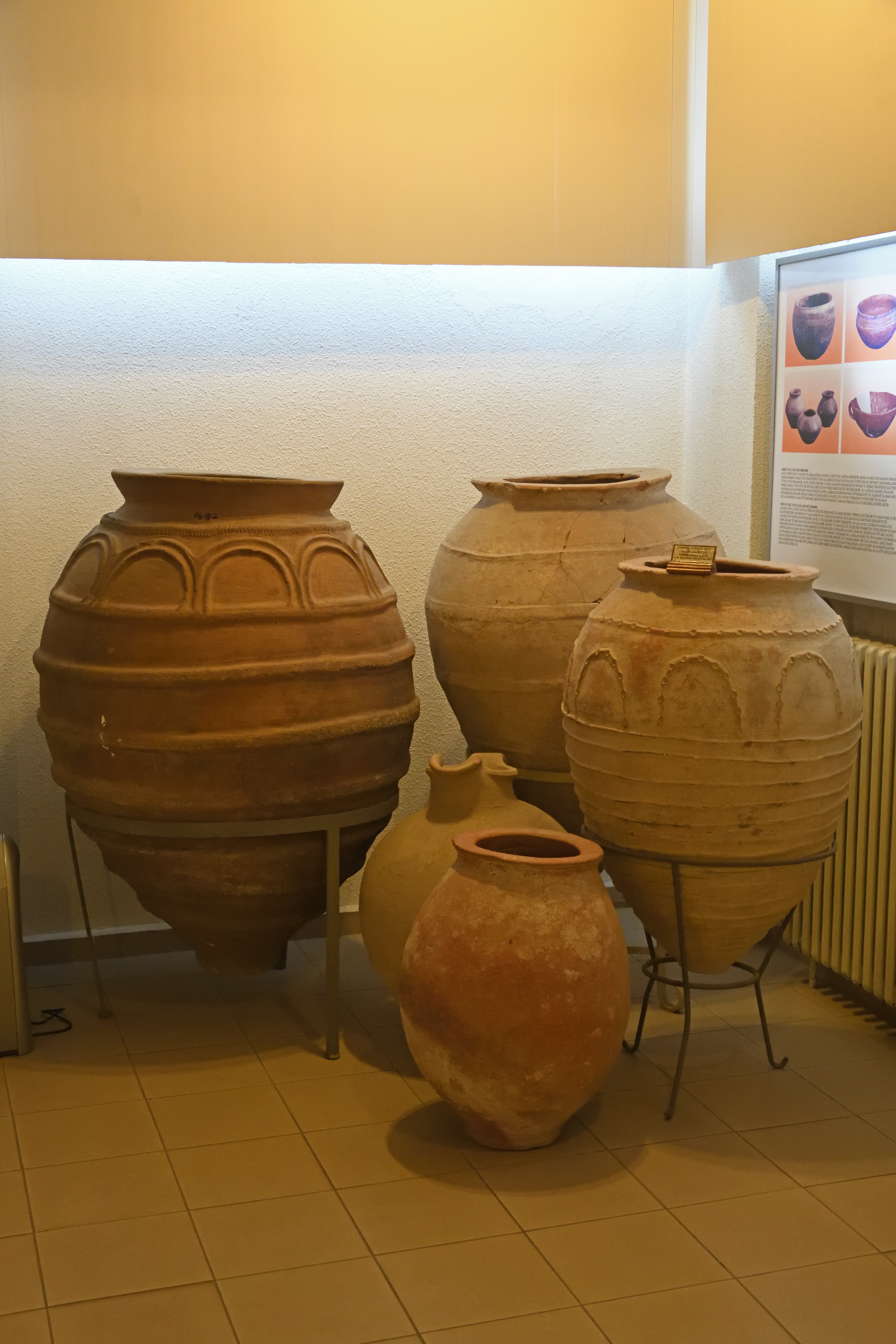
Nevşehir Museum: Late Byzantine earthenware vessels

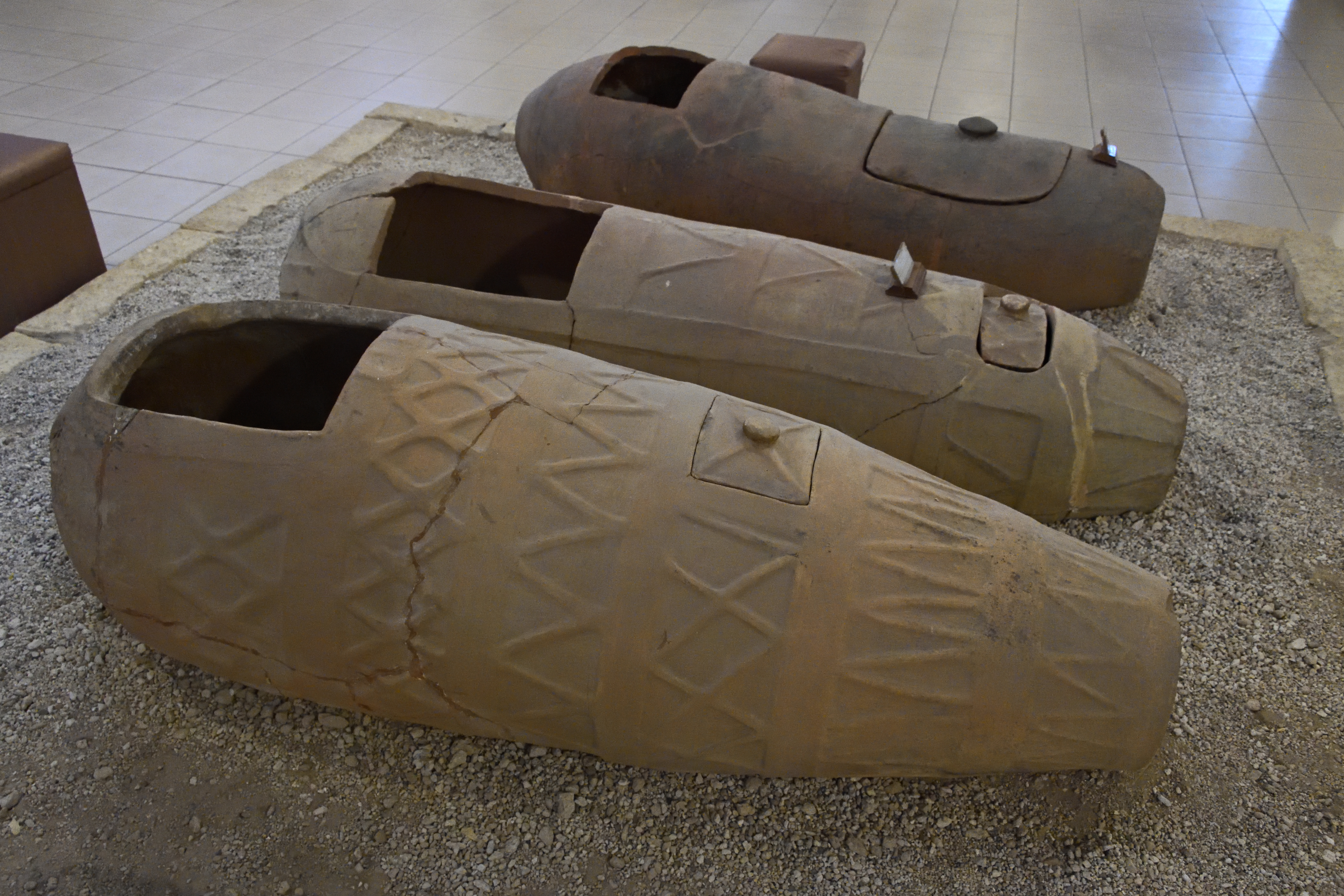
Nevşehir Museum: terracotta sarcophagi, 3rd-4th centuries AD

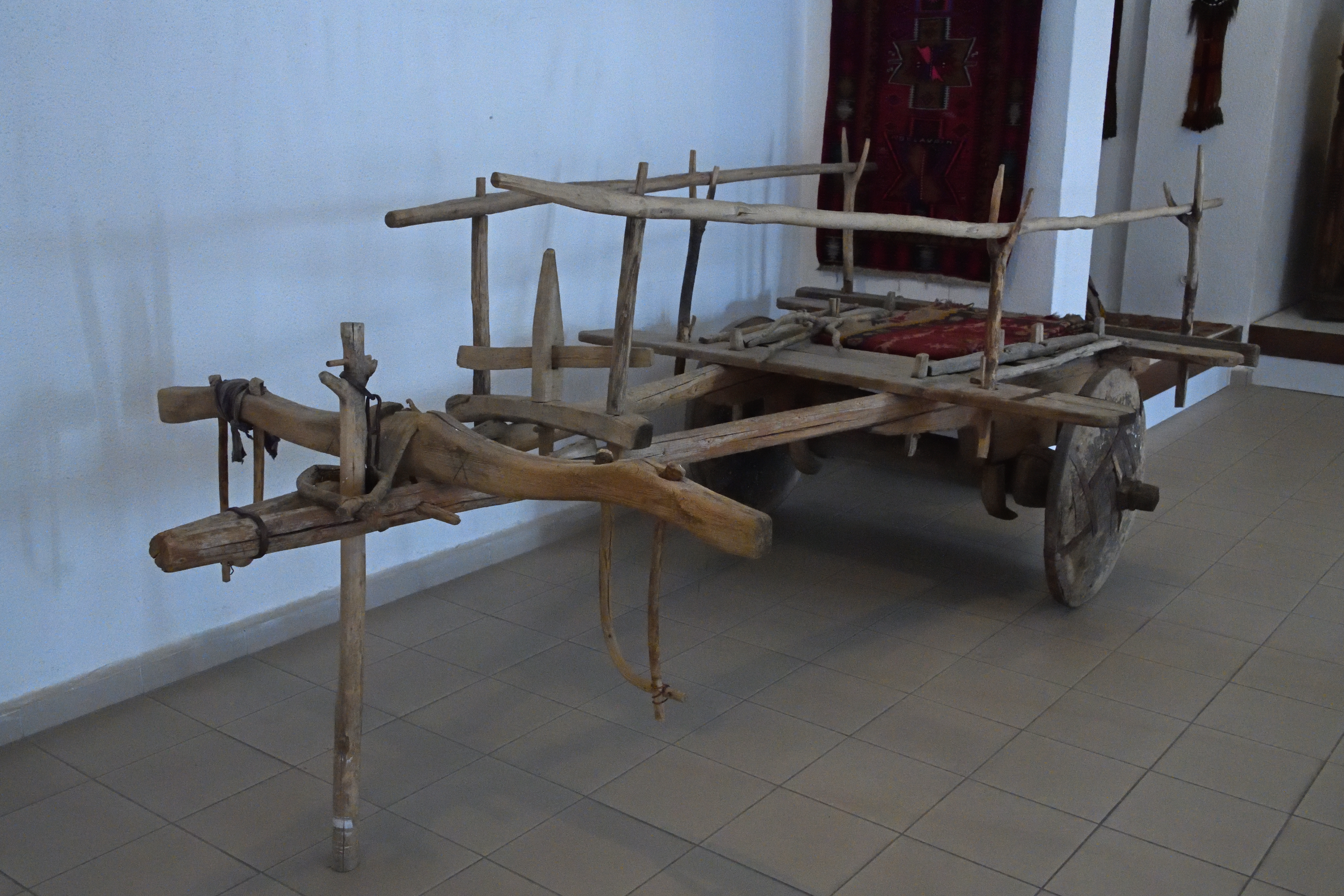
Nevşehir Museum: ox-drawn cart

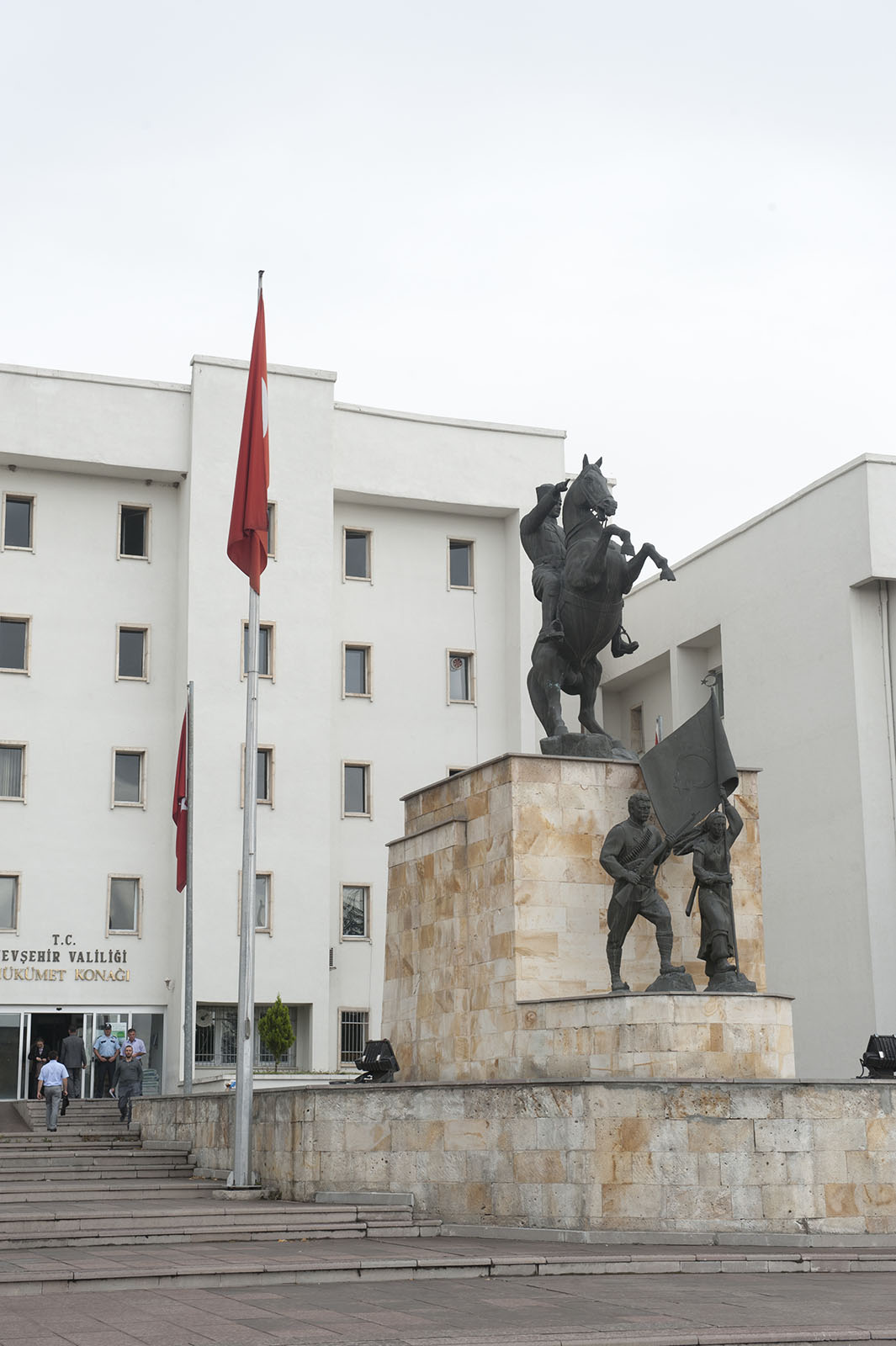
Nevşehir municipality offices and statue of Atatürk

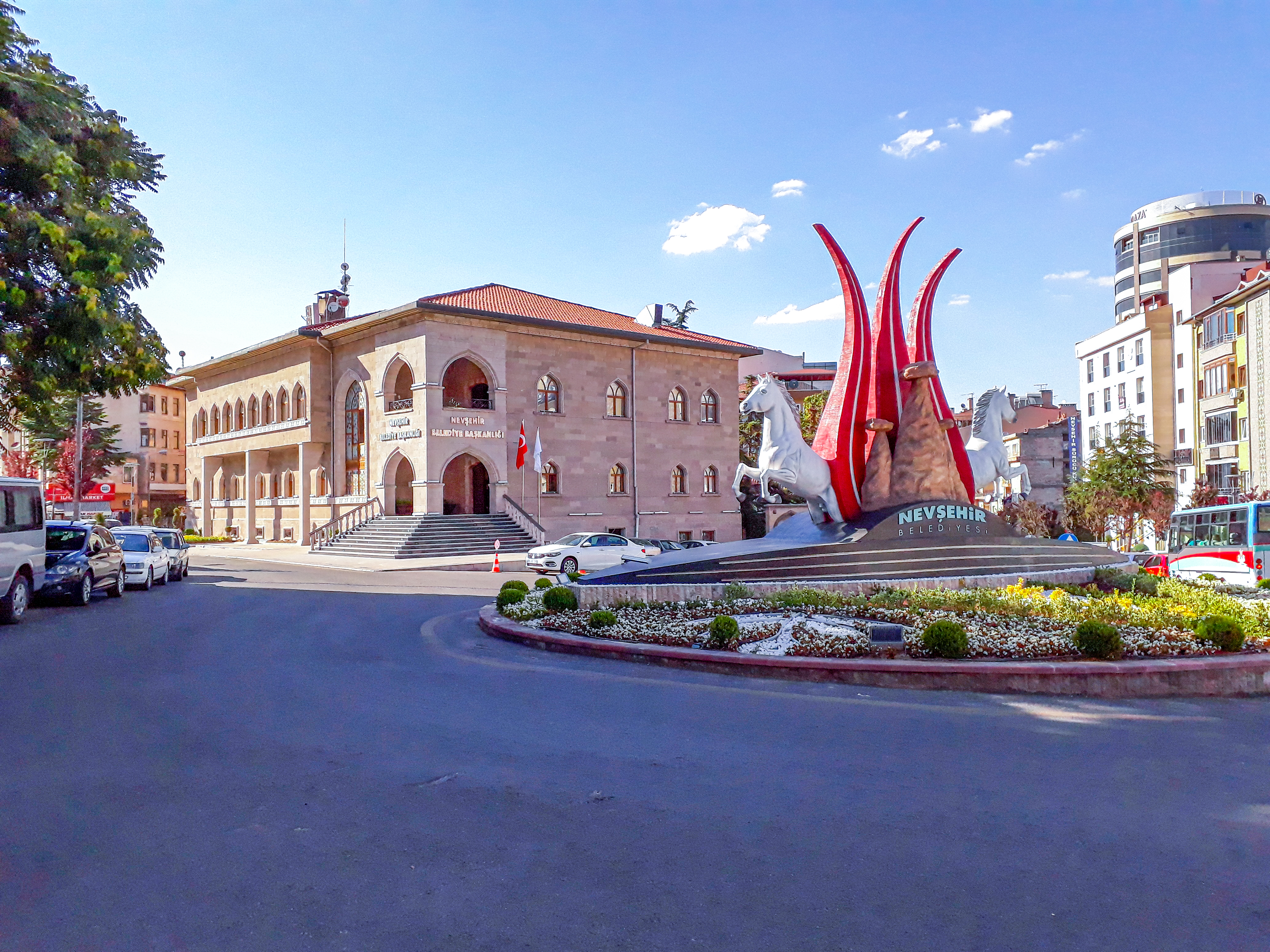
Nevşehir Municipality

== Climate ==
Nevşehir has a continental climate (Köppen climate classification: Dsa, Trewartha climate classification: Dc), with cold, snowy winters and warm, dry summers. Precipitation occurs throughout the year, with a slight peak in spring.

Highest recorded temperature:39.5 °C (103.1 °F) on 30 July 2000
Lowest recorded temperature:−23.6 °C (−10.5 °F) on 4 February 1960

Climate data for Nevşehir (1991–2020, extremes 1959–2023)
Month	Jan	Feb	Mar	Apr	May	Jun	Jul	Aug	Sep	Oct	Nov	Dec	Year
Record high °C (°F)	19.8 (67.6)	19.6 (67.3)	28.0 (82.4)	31.6 (88.9)	32.6 (90.7)	35.0 (95.0)	39.5 (103.1)	38.2 (100.8)	37.4 (99.3)	32.0 (89.6)	27.6 (81.7)	23.0 (73.4)	39.5 (103.1)
Mean daily maximum °C (°F)	4.1 (39.4)	6.0 (42.8)	10.9 (51.6)	16.3 (61.3)	21.2 (70.2)	25.6 (78.1)	29.3 (84.7)	29.4 (84.9)	25.3 (77.5)	19.1 (66.4)	11.6 (52.9)	6.2 (43.2)	17.1 (62.8)
Daily mean °C (°F)	0.0 (32.0)	1.3 (34.3)	5.5 (41.9)	10.4 (50.7)	15.0 (59.0)	18.9 (66.0)	22.2 (72.0)	22.1 (71.8)	18.1 (64.6)	12.8 (55.0)	6.3 (43.3)	2.0 (35.6)	11.2 (52.2)
Mean daily minimum °C (°F)	−3.5 (25.7)	−2.6 (27.3)	1.0 (33.8)	5.2 (41.4)	9.3 (48.7)	12.3 (54.1)	14.6 (58.3)	14.5 (58.1)	11.3 (52.3)	7.4 (45.3)	2.1 (35.8)	−1.4 (29.5)	5.9 (42.6)
Record low °C (°F)	−21.2 (−6.2)	−23.6 (−10.5)	−18.0 (−0.4)	−12.5 (9.5)	−2.3 (27.9)	1.3 (34.3)	3.8 (38.8)	3.1 (37.6)	−1.2 (29.8)	−7.6 (18.3)	−14.0 (6.8)	−19.5 (−3.1)	−23.6 (−10.5)
Average precipitation mm (inches)	43.7 (1.72)	41.8 (1.65)	47.5 (1.87)	45.7 (1.80)	57.4 (2.26)	37.5 (1.48)	9.9 (0.39)	9.6 (0.38)	13.7 (0.54)	29.4 (1.16)	33.4 (1.31)	48.4 (1.91)	418.0 (16.46)
Average precipitation days	12.13	11.7	13.03	11.97	13.37	8.27	2.27	2.17	3.5	7.2	8.27	11.77	105.65
Average snowy days	8.9	5.7	6.8	1.5	0	0	0	0	0	0.2	1.8	5.3	30.2
Average relative humidity (%)	70.8	67.1	61.4	57.1	56.0	52.9	47.5	48.0	48.3	56.9	64.1	69.6	58.3
Mean monthly sunshine hours	95.7	118.4	163.0	204.7	258.7	309.6	364.5	346.7	274.8	196.3	138.7	85.4	2,556.5
Mean daily sunshine hours	3.1	4.2	5.3	6.8	8.3	10.3	11.8	11.2	9.2	6.3	4.6	2.8	7.0
Source 1: Turkish State Meteorological Service,
Source 2: NOAA (humidity, sun 1991-2020), Meteomanz(snow days 2013-2023)

== Notable people ==
- Filippos Aristovoulos (1832–1903), Ottoman Greek scholar and Caloyer
- Abdullah Çatlı (1956-1996), Turkish government assassin and leader of the Grey Wolves
- Esra Yildiz, Boxer
- Roger Delgado (1918-1973), died in a car accident
