= Kalaba, Nevşehir =

Kalaba
- Municipality
- Location in Turkey Kalaba (Turkey Central Anatolia)
- Coordinates: 38°58′N 35°00′E
- Country: Turkey
- Province: Nevşehir
- District: Avanos
- Elevation: 1,170 m (3,840 ft)
- Population (2022): 4,195
- Time zone: UTC+3 (TRT)
- Postal code: 50840
- Area code: 0384

Kalaba is a town (belde) in the Avanos District, Nevşehir Province, Turkey. Its population is 4,195 (2022).

== Geography ==
Kalaba is located on Turkish state highway D.260. It is 38 kilometres (24 mi) from Avanos and 50 kilometres (31 mi) from Nevşehir.

== History ==
Kalaba was founded in the 1800s. The former name Karayusuf Höyüğü refers to the founder of the settlement. It was then renamed Kalaba. In 1972 it was declared a seat of township.

== Economy ==
Major economic activities are agriculture and animal breeding. Main crops are cereals and sunflower. The Nevşehir Cement factory is situated to the east of Kalaba and some town residents work in the factory. Also many Kalaba residents work in West Europe as foreign worker (Gastarbeiter)
