= Cappadocia University =

- Kapadokya Üniversitesi
- University logo
- Former name: Cappadocia Vocational School
- Type: Foundation University
- Established: 2005
- Founders: İlke Education and Health Foundation
- Rector: Prof. Dr. Hasan Ali Karasar
- Academic staff: 334 (2023–24)
- Students: 6,825 (2023–24)
- Undergraduates: 6,825 (2023–24)
- Postgraduates: 424 (2023–24)
- Doctoral students: 12 (2023–24)
- Location: Nevşehir, Istanbul, Turkey
- Website: kapadokya.edu.tr

Cappadocia University (Turkish: Kapadokya Üniversitesi), formerly known as Cappadocia Vocational School (KMYO), is a foundation (private, non-profit) university established in 2005 by the İlke Education and Health Foundation. It received university status in 2017. The university operates two main campuses: Mustafapaşa (Nevşehir province) and Pendik (Istanbul Sabiha Gökçen Airport).

== History ==
Cappadocia University started as Cappadocia Vocational School with five associate degree programs in 2005. In 2017, it was granted university status. It is recognized for its pioneering programs in civil aviation and health sciences, and is among the leading foundation universities in Turkey.

== Academic units ==
=== Faculties ===
- Faculty of Humanities
- Faculty of Dentistry
- Faculty of Economics and Administrative Sciences

=== Schools and Vocational Schools ===
- School of Health Sciences
- School of Applied Sciences
- Cappadocia Vocational School

=== Institutes ===
- Institute of Graduate Education

=== Selected Vocational Programs ===
- Civil Aviation Management
- Cabin Services
- Aircraft Technology
- Flight Dispatcher Training
- Dental Prosthesis Technology
- Anesthesia
- Dialysis
- Physiotherapy
- Emergency and First Aid
- Audiometry
- Opticianry
- Pathology Laboratory Techniques
- Medical Imaging Techniques
- Computer Programming
- Architectural Restoration
- Tourist Guidance

== Aviation Education and Authorizations ==
Cappadocia University is authorized by the Turkish Directorate General of Civil Aviation (SHGM) for multiple aviation training and certification programs.

== Human Resources ==
At Cappadocia University, there are a total of 229 academic staff members. This includes 90 instructors, 9 associate professors, 32 research assistants, 19 professors, 9 foreign academics, and 70 faculty members.

== Campus Life ==
Cappadocia University offers a wide range of facilities inside the campus, made to meet the students daily needs. The university provides places of worship, a cafeteria, bicycle paths, walkways, a health center, cafés, restaurants, a market, a stationery store, ATMs, and various service facilities, ensuring a comfortable and convenient campus experience for students.

== Sports Facility ==
There are many different sports facilities at the university that students with diverse interests can use for physical activities. These facilities include a table tennis area, bicycle paths, a football field, an indoor sports hall, a fitness room, an astro pitch, a basketball sports hall, and walkways, providing students with a variety of options to stay active and healthy.
