= Nevşehir Hacı Bektaş Veli University =

Public university in Nevşehir, Turkey

Nevşehir Hacı Bektaş University
- Nevşehir Hacı Bektaş Üniversitesi
- Other name: Nevşehir Üniversitesi
- Established: 2007
- Location: Nevşehir
- Website: https://www.nevsehir.edu.tr/

Nevşehir Hacı Bektaş Veli University (Turkish: Nevşehir Hacı Bektaş Üniversitesi), commonly referred to as Nevşehir University, is a public institute of higher education established in 2007 located in Nevşehir, Turkey.

== Affiliations ==
The university is a member of the Caucasus University Association. Prof. Dr. Semih Aktekin, who was appointed as Acting Rector of Nevşehir Hacı Bektaş Veli University by the Council of Higher Education on 26. 03. 2020, was appointed as the Rector in person with the Presidential Decree No. 2020/304 dated 23 June 2020 published in the Official Gazette on 24.06.2020.
