= Nevşehir Castle =

Historic castle

- Nevşehir Kalesi
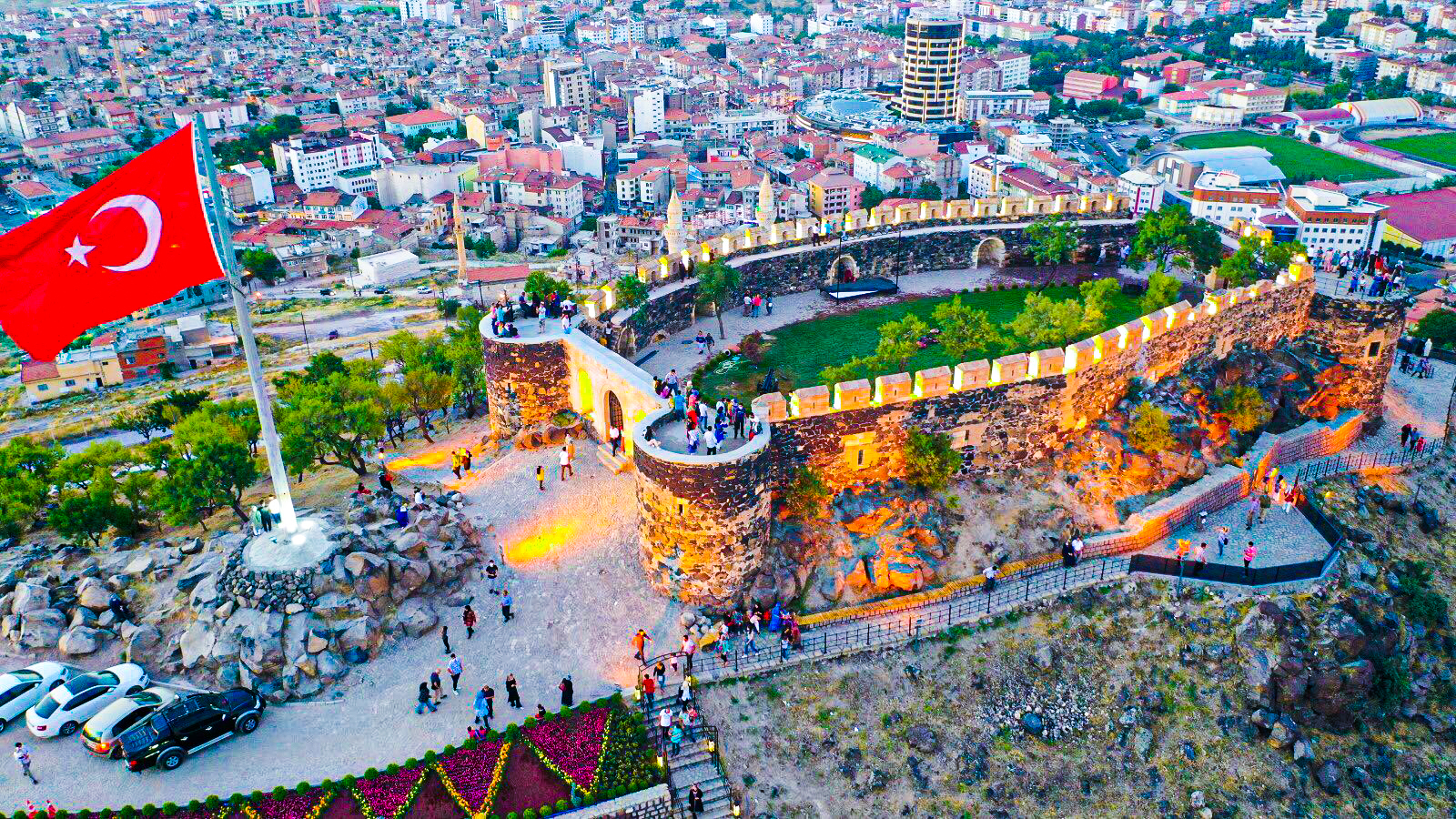
- Panoramic view of Nevşehir Castle

- Location within Turkey
- Established: 11th century BC or earlier
- Location: Nevşehir, Turkey
- Coordinates: 38°37′35″N 34°42′50″E
- Type: Castle
- Owners: Byzantine Empire; Seljuq Turks (11th century BC); Ottoman Empire (1356); Turkey (1923)
- Website: www.nevsehir.bel.tr

Nevşehir Castle (Turkish: Nevşehir Kalesi) is a historic castle in the city of Nevşehir, overlooking the underground city of Kayaşehir. It was a fortress for defensive, military purposes.

== History ==
Not much is known about Nevşehir Castle, it is theorized to have been built by the Seljuks around 1100, though it also theorized to have been built by the Byzantines as a military outpost.

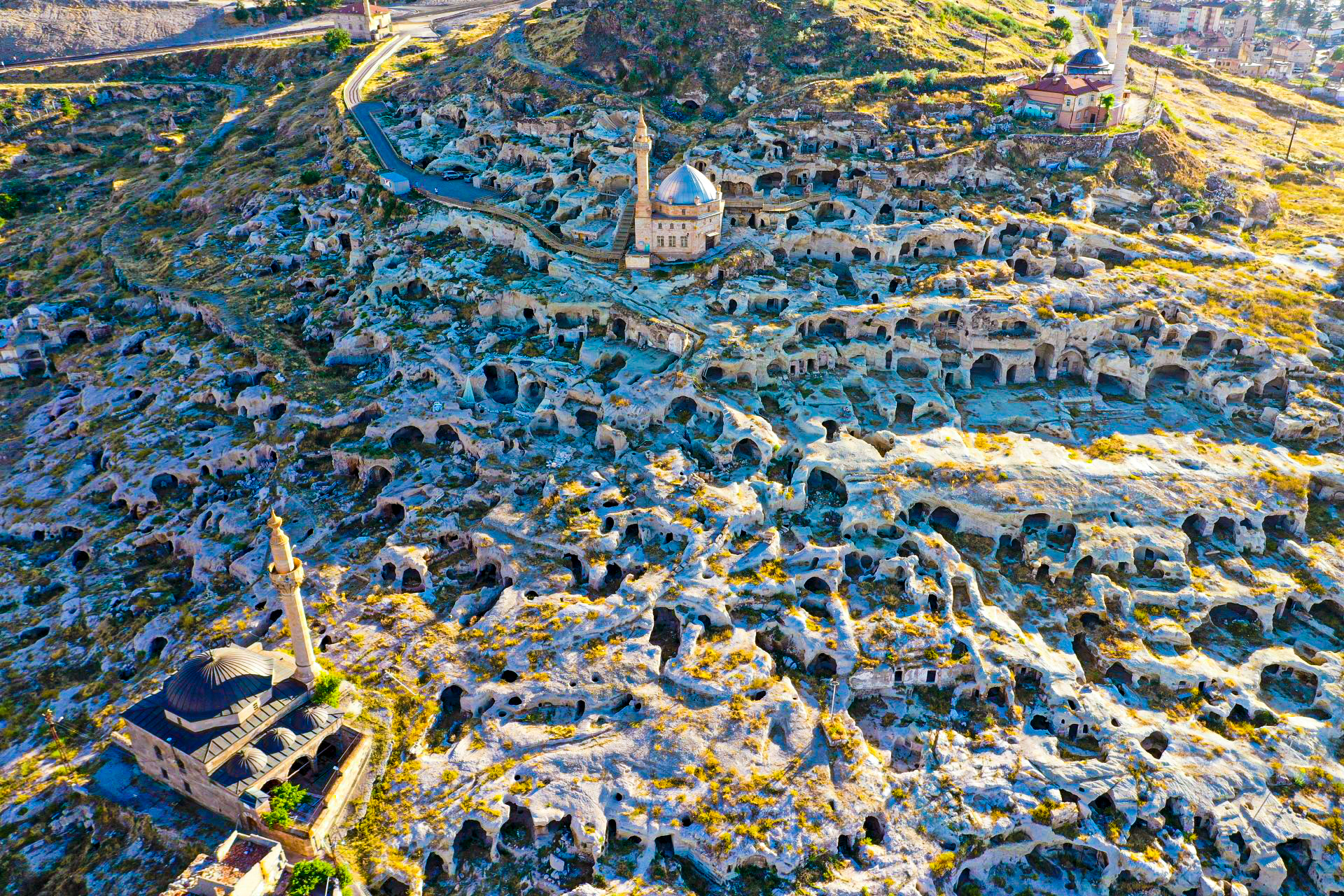
Aerial view of Kayaşehir underground city
