= Özkonak =

- Municipality
- Location in Turkey Özkonak (Turkey Central Anatolia)
- Coordinates: 38°48′47″N 34°50′22″E
- Country: Turkey
- Province: Nevşehir
- District: Avanos
- Population (2022): 3,151
- Time zone: UTC+3 (TRT)

Özkonak is a town (belde) in the Avanos District, Nevşehir Province, Turkey. Its population is 3,151 (2022). It is the site of the Özkonak Underground City.
