= Filippos Aristovoulos =

Ottoman Greek scholar and Caloyer

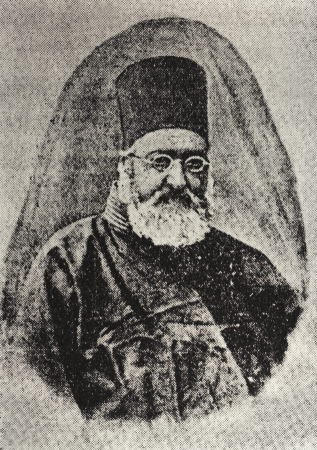
Filippos Aristovoulos in the late 19th or early 20th century.

Filippos Aristovoulos (Greek: Φίλιππος Αριστόβουλος; romanized: Fílippos Aristóvoulos) was an Ottoman Greek scholar and Caloyer.

== Biography ==
He was born in 1832 in Neapolis, then Ottoman Empire (now Nevşehir, Turkey). He graduated from the Phanar Greek Orthodox College and the Theological School of Halki, from where he received his degree in 1856. He returned to his hometown, Neapolis, where he taught for 40 years, both as a layman and a monk. He promoted and struggled for the rights of the local Cappadocian Greeks on the governing board of the province, and for this reason he was respected by the locals. He died in August 1903 in Neapolis.

=== Works ===
Some of his notable works are the following:

- Translation to Cappadocian Greek the work of Leon Melas, Gerostáthis (Γεροστάθης)
- Μoral speeches of the apostolic cuts on Sundays and
- the Ekklisiastikín Alítheia (Εκκλησιαστικήν Αλήθεια) or in English the Ecclesiastical Truth, which included the biography of Metropolitan Chalepios Theoktistos, who was his patron.
