= Çalış, Avanos =

Çalış
- Municipality
- Location in Turkey Çalış (Turkey Central Anatolia)
- Coordinates: 38°59′04″N 34°51′49″E
- Country: Turkey
- Province: Nevşehir
- District: Avanos
- Population (2022): 1,810
- Time zone: UTC+3 (TRT)

Çalış is a town (belde) in the Avanos District, Nevşehir Province, Turkey. Its population is 1,810 (2022).
