= Avanos District =

District of Nevşehir Province, Turkey

- District
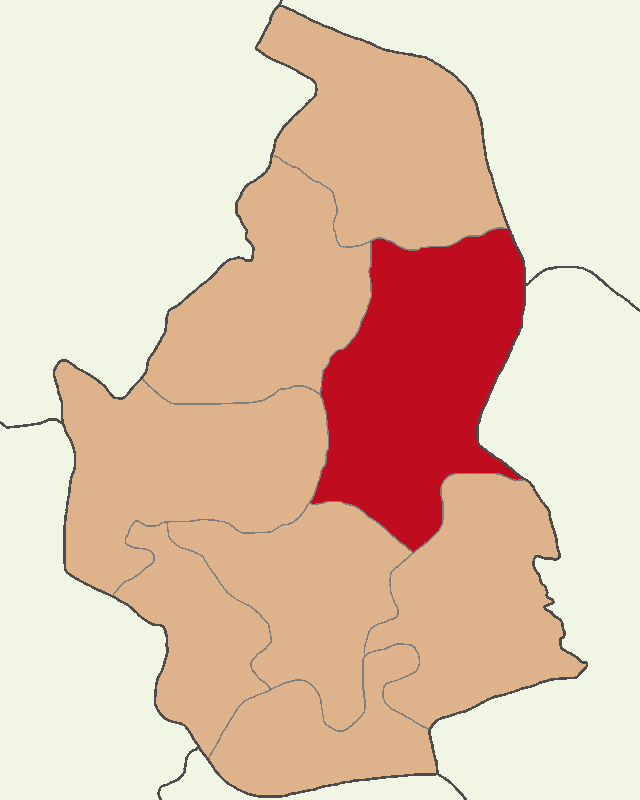
- Map showing Avanos District in Nevşehir Province

- Location in Turkey Avanos District (Turkey Central Anatolia)
- Coordinates: 38°43′N 34°51′E
- Country: Turkey
- Province: Nevşehir
- Seat: Avanos

Government
  - Kaymakam: Olgun Öner
- Area: 995 km^{2} (384 sq mi)
- Population (2022): 32,477
  - Density: 33/km^{2} (85/sq mi)
- Time zone: UTC+3 (TRT)
- Website: www.avanos.gov.tr

Avanos District is a district of the Nevşehir Province of Turkey. Its seat is the town of Avanos. Its area is 995 km^{2}, and its population is 32,477 (2022). The highest point is Mt. İsmail Sivrisi at 1,756 m (5,761 ft).

== Composition ==
There are four municipalities in Avanos District:

- Avanos
- Çalış
- Kalaba
- Özkonak

There are 16 villages in Avanos District:

- Akarca
- Aktepe
- Altıpınar
- Ayhan
- Bozca
- Çavuşin
- Göynük
- İğdelikışla
- Karacauşağı
- Küçükayhan
- Kuyulukışla
- Mahmat
- Paşalı
- Sarılar
- Topaklı
- Üçkuyu
