= Çavuşin =

- Village
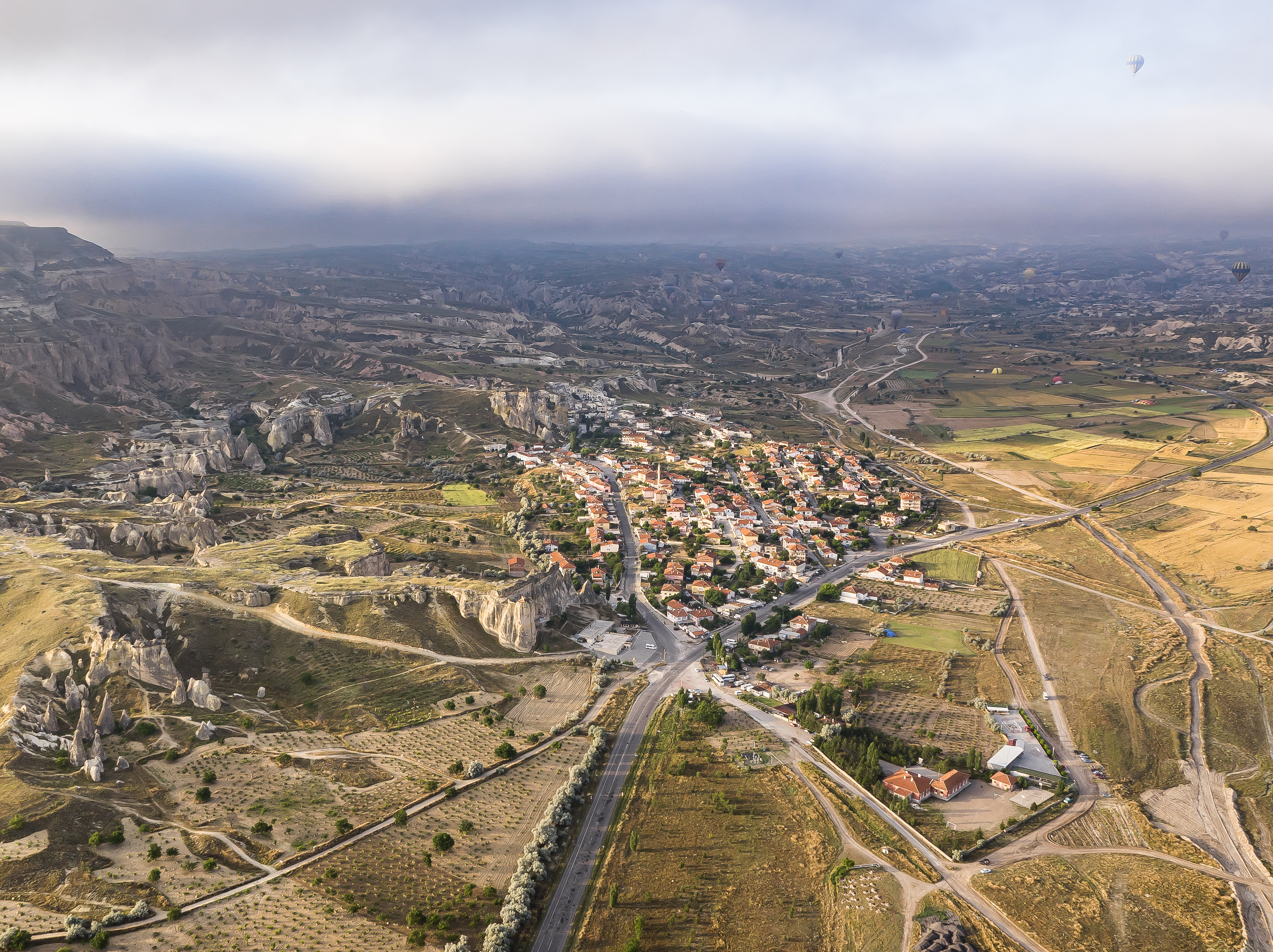
- Aerial view of Çavuşin

- Location within Turkey Location within Turkey Central Anatolia
- Coordinates: 38°40′22″N 34°50′22″E
- Country: Turkey
- Province: Nevşehir
- District: Avanos
- Population (2022): 421
- Time zone: UTC+3 (TRT)

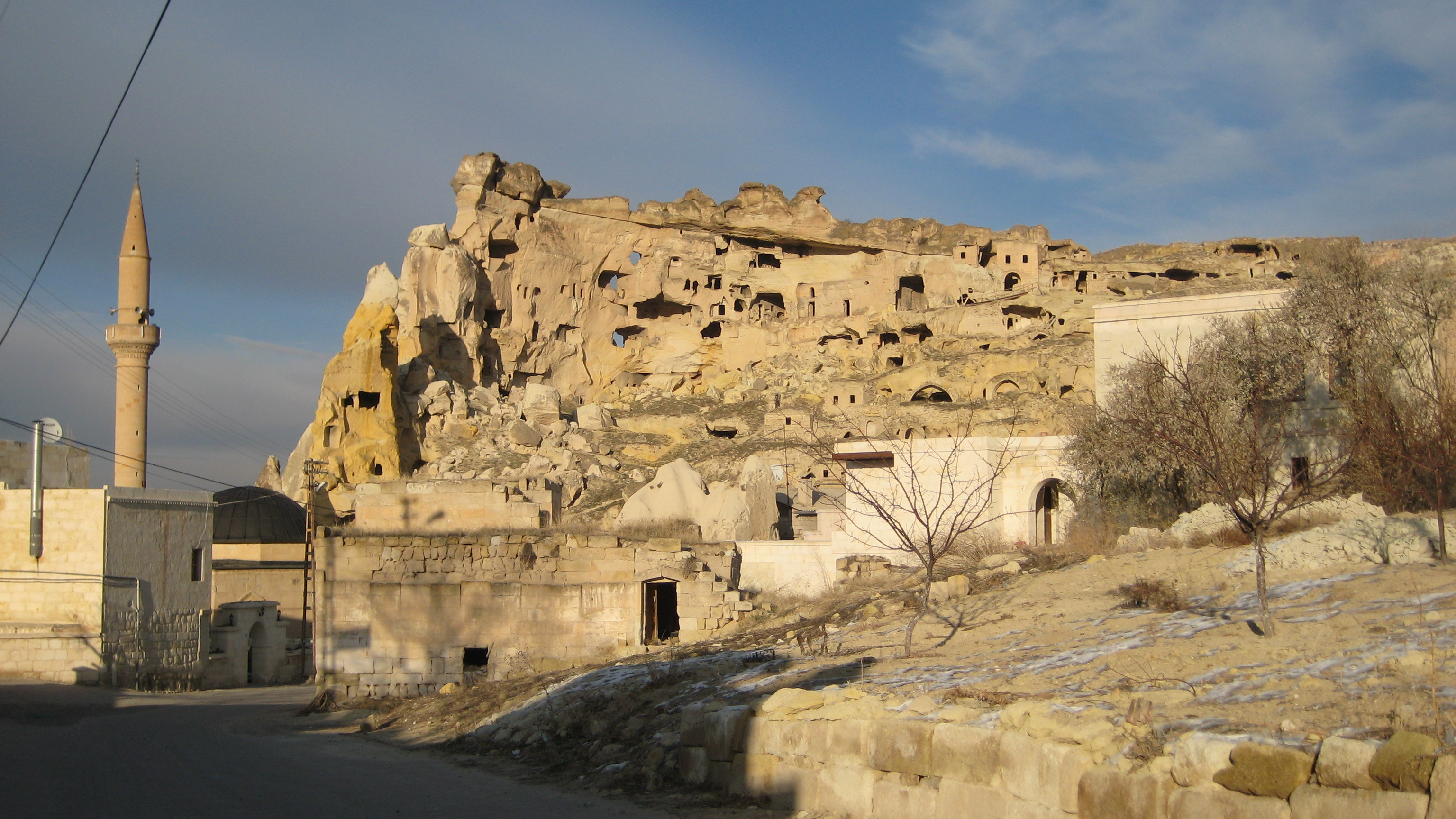
View of rock ridge above Çavuşin.

Çavuşin is a village in the Avanos District in Nevşehir Province in the Cappadocia region of Turkey. Its population is 421 (2022). It is on the road between Avanos and Göreme, about five kilometres north of Göreme. The older part of the village lies on and around a large ridge of rock visible for miles around. Most of the modern homes are closer to the main road where villagers were rehoused in the early 1960s amid fears that their old homes might collapse. Until recently Çavuşin was more or less ignored by tourism despite its proximity to the Göreme honeypot. However, in the 2010s more hotels opened in Cavuşin too, especially in the older part of the village.

== History ==
The village may have been called Kodessane in the early Christian era.

In 2011, an American named Duke Dillard moved to Çavuşin with his family and set up the Captivating Cappadocia website which has photos and information on the village.

== Attractions ==
Çavuşin is home to two rock-cut churches that are worth seeking out. Confusingly, both are named after St John the Baptist.

The first of the churches is right beside the main road and clearly visible because part of its facade has fallen down, exposing two huge frescoed angels to the open air. Inside the church there are brightly coloured frescoes of familiar Bible stories such as the Nativity. More original are the frescoed figures of soldiers in uniform that run along the lower part of the north wall. They depict the Forty Martyrs of Sebaste (modern Sivas) who were driven out naked onto a frozen lake to die during a persecution of Christians in the early 4th century.

Particularly interesting are the frescoes of the Byzantine Emperor Nicephorus Phocas (a Cappadocian on his mother's side) and his wife Theophano. Since the emperor visited Cappadocia in the mid-10th century, the church has been dated unusually precisely to 963-969. The story of the emperor's sticky end as a result of an assassination plot and the part Theophano may have played in it is described in John Ash's book, A Byzantine Journey.

The second church is harder to find in the old part of the village but is particularly impressive. It is a huge, soot-blackened early 6th-century basilica that is more interesting for its carved decorations than for its frescoes which are barely visible now. A cross-shaped hole in the floor of the apse may once have contained relics of St Hieron, an obscure saint strongly linked to Göreme.

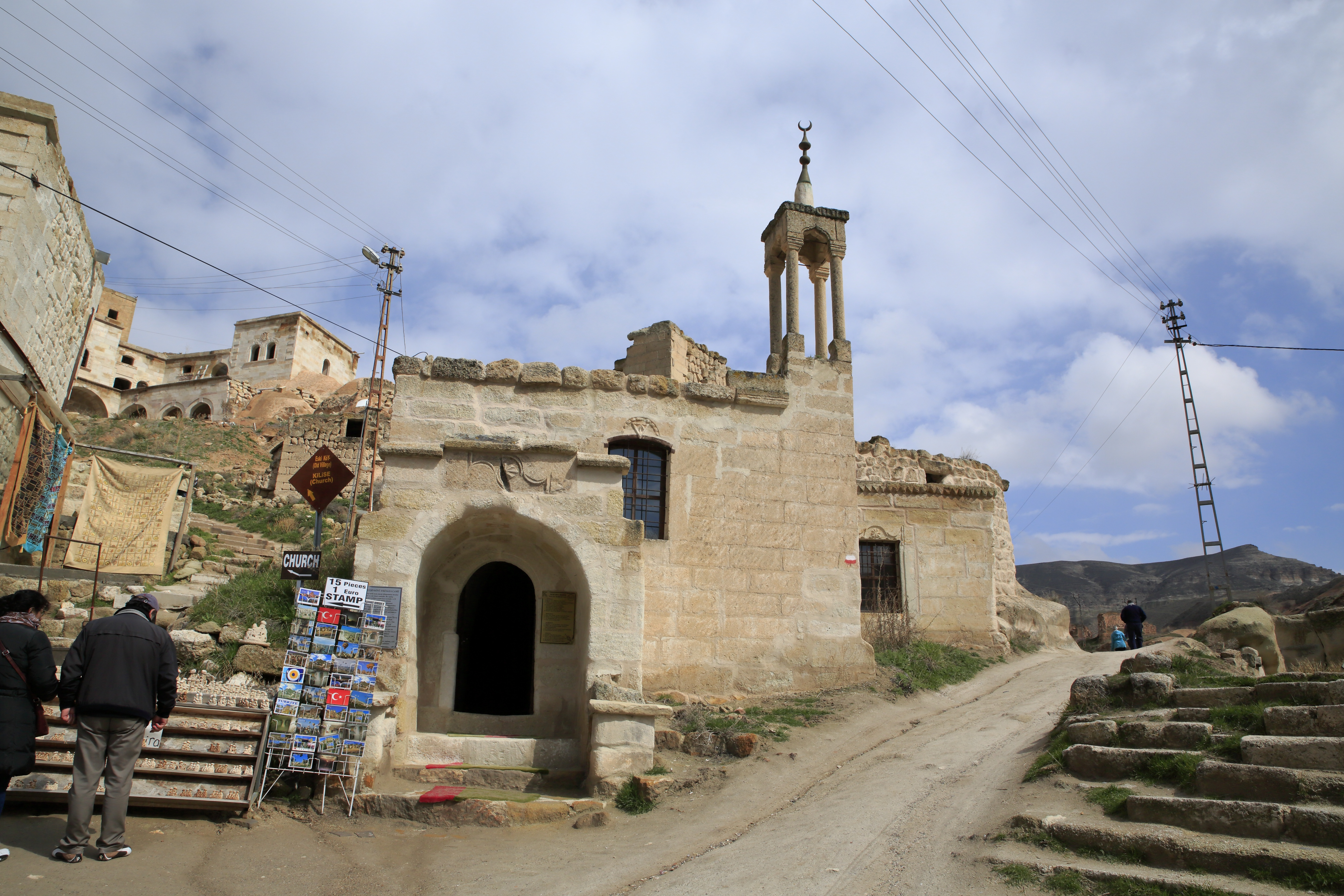
Çavuşin, Old Kaya mosque.

From the ridge above Çavuşin it is possible to look down on a group of fairy chimneys' that make it fairly apparent how the wind and rain of the centuries gradually eroded solid rock to create these features that are so characteristic of Cappadocia.

== Gallery ==
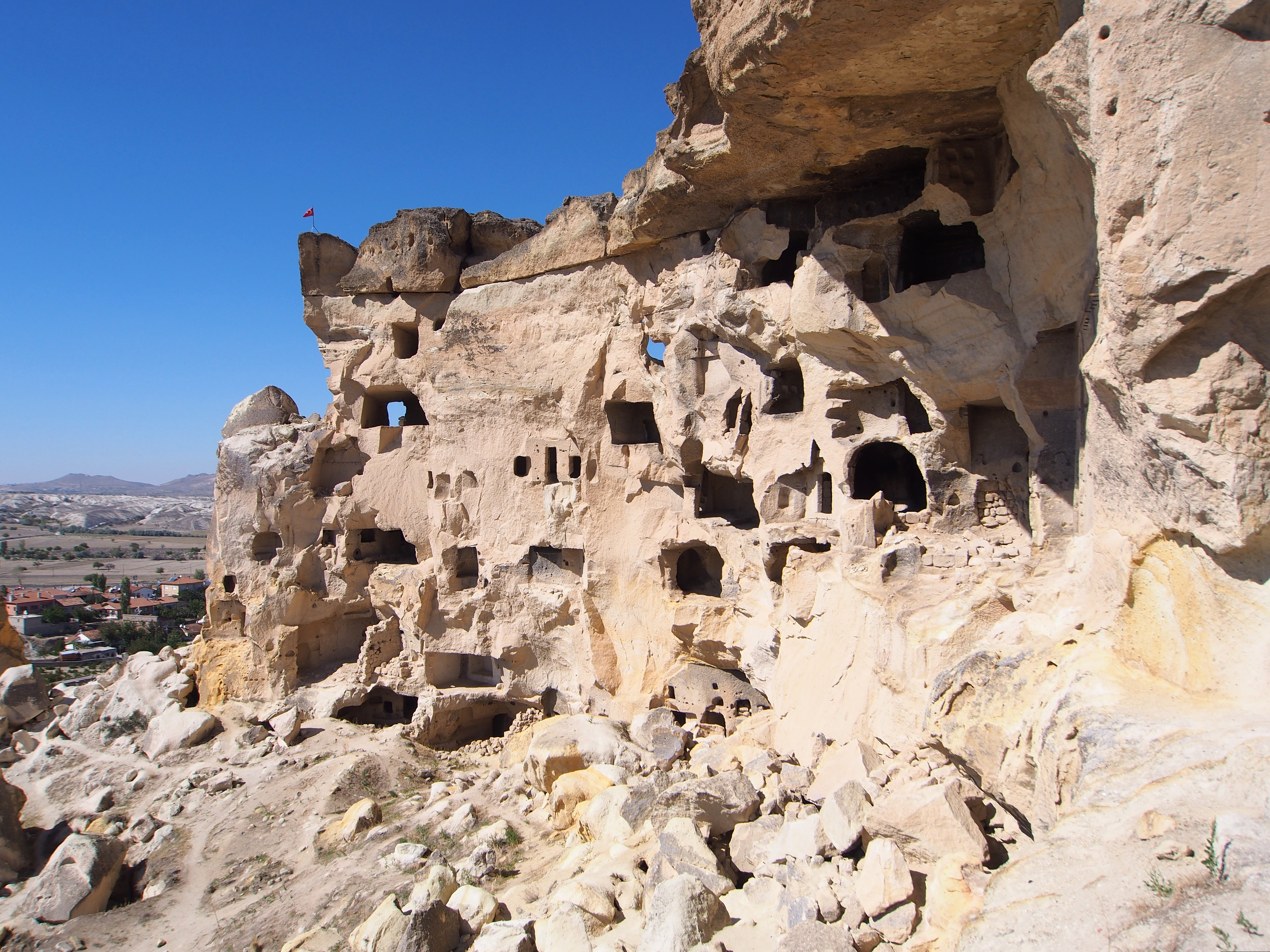
Cave Dwellings in Çavuşin

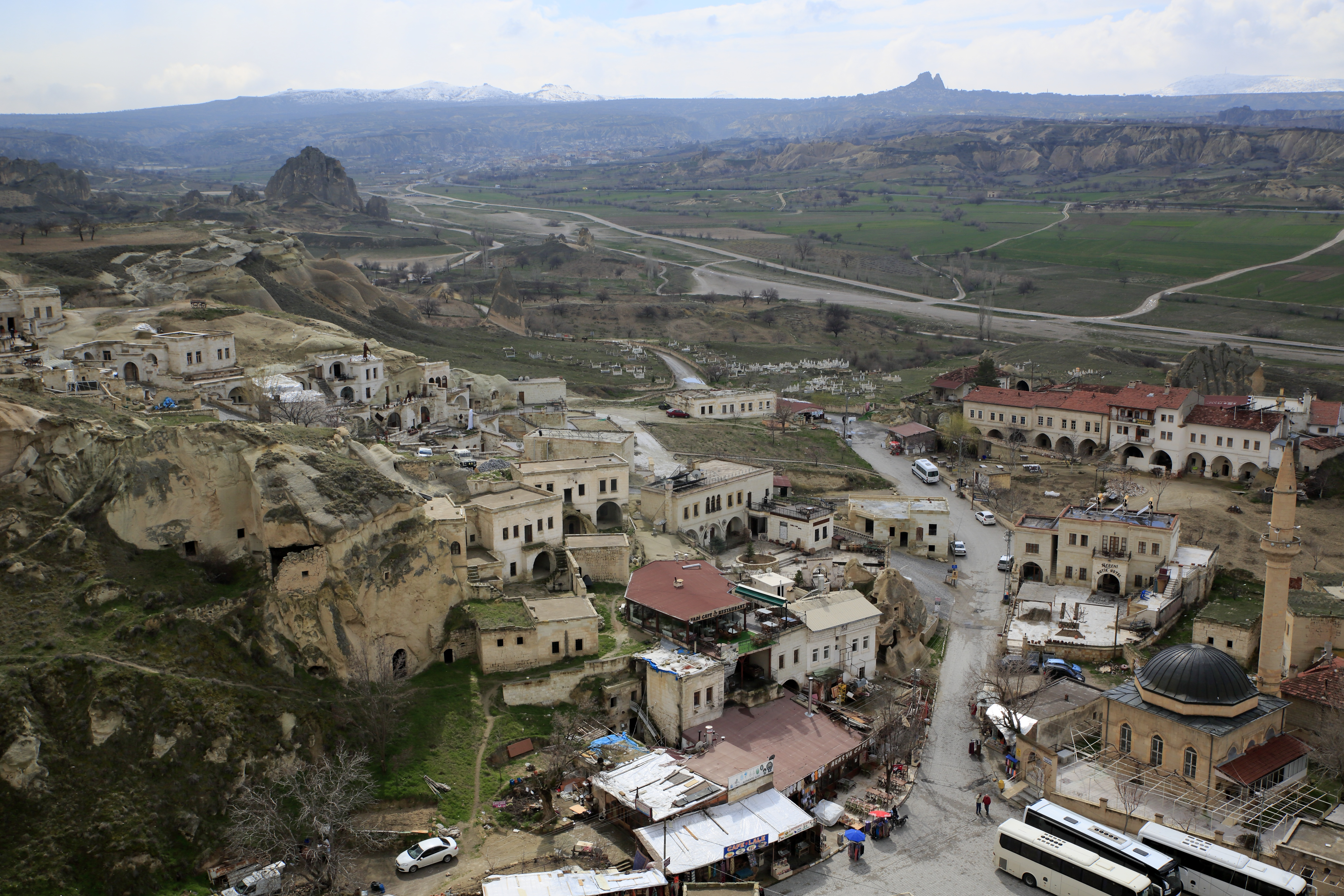
View overlooking Çavuşin

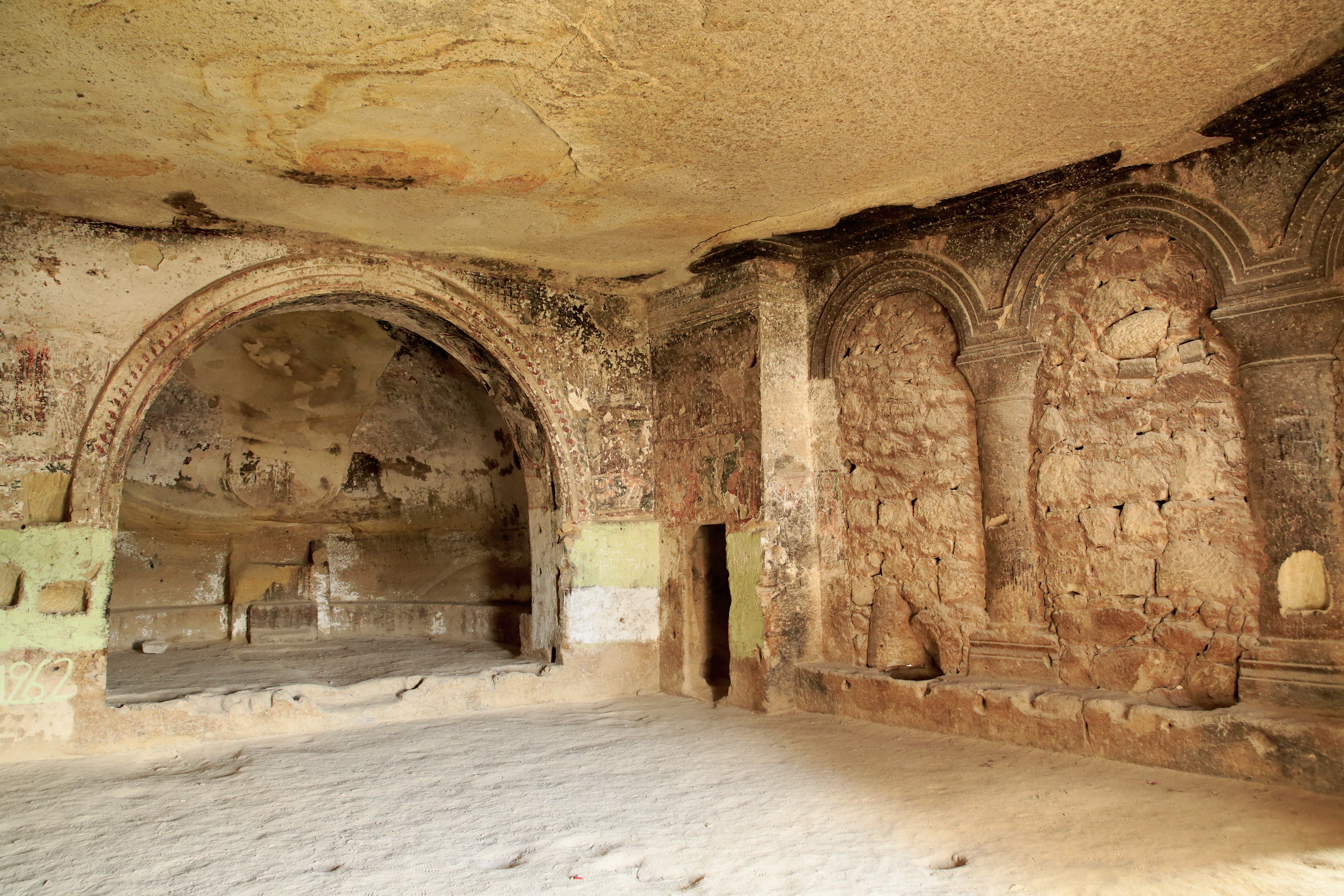
St. John's Church, Çavuşin

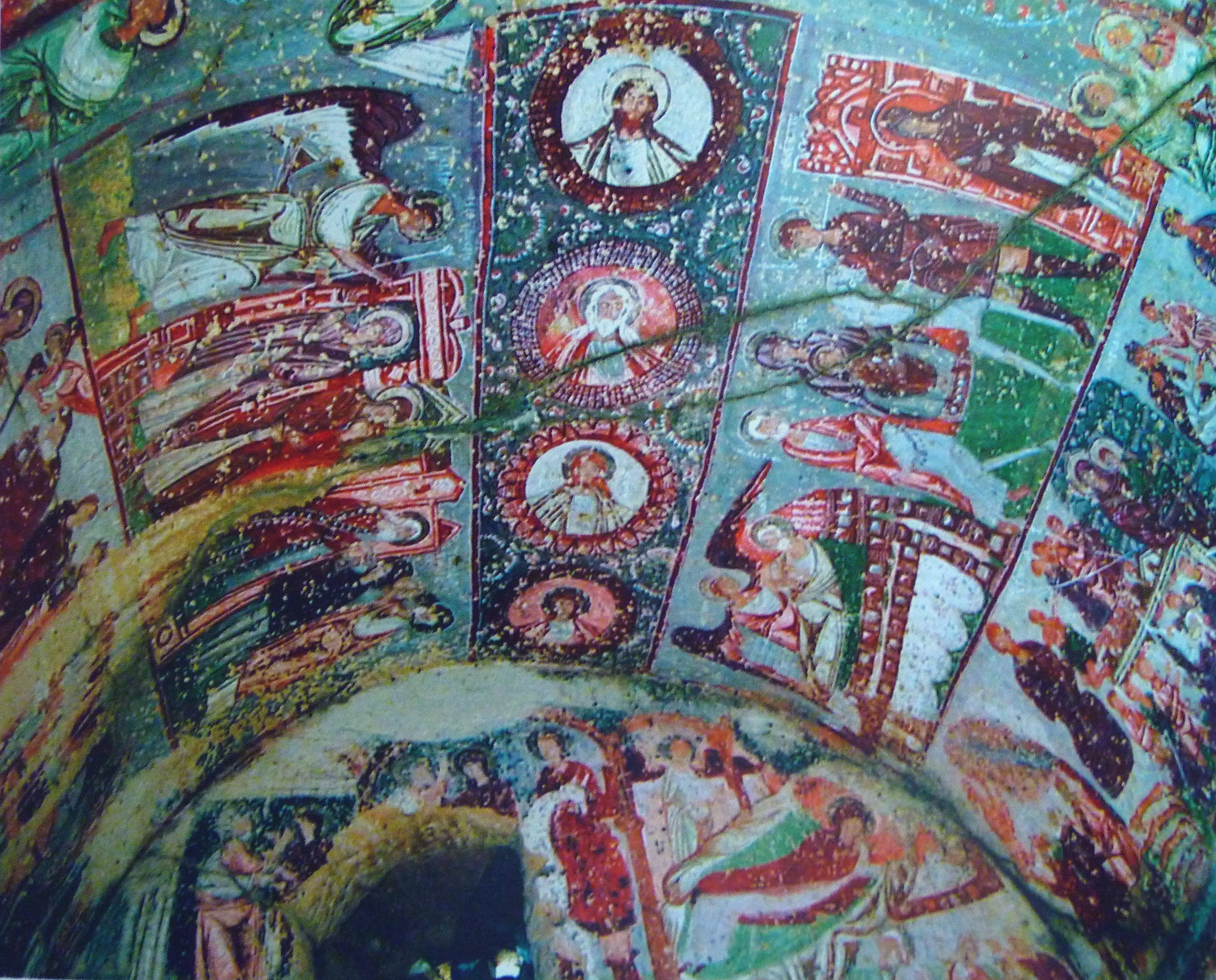
Frescos inside Çavuşin church

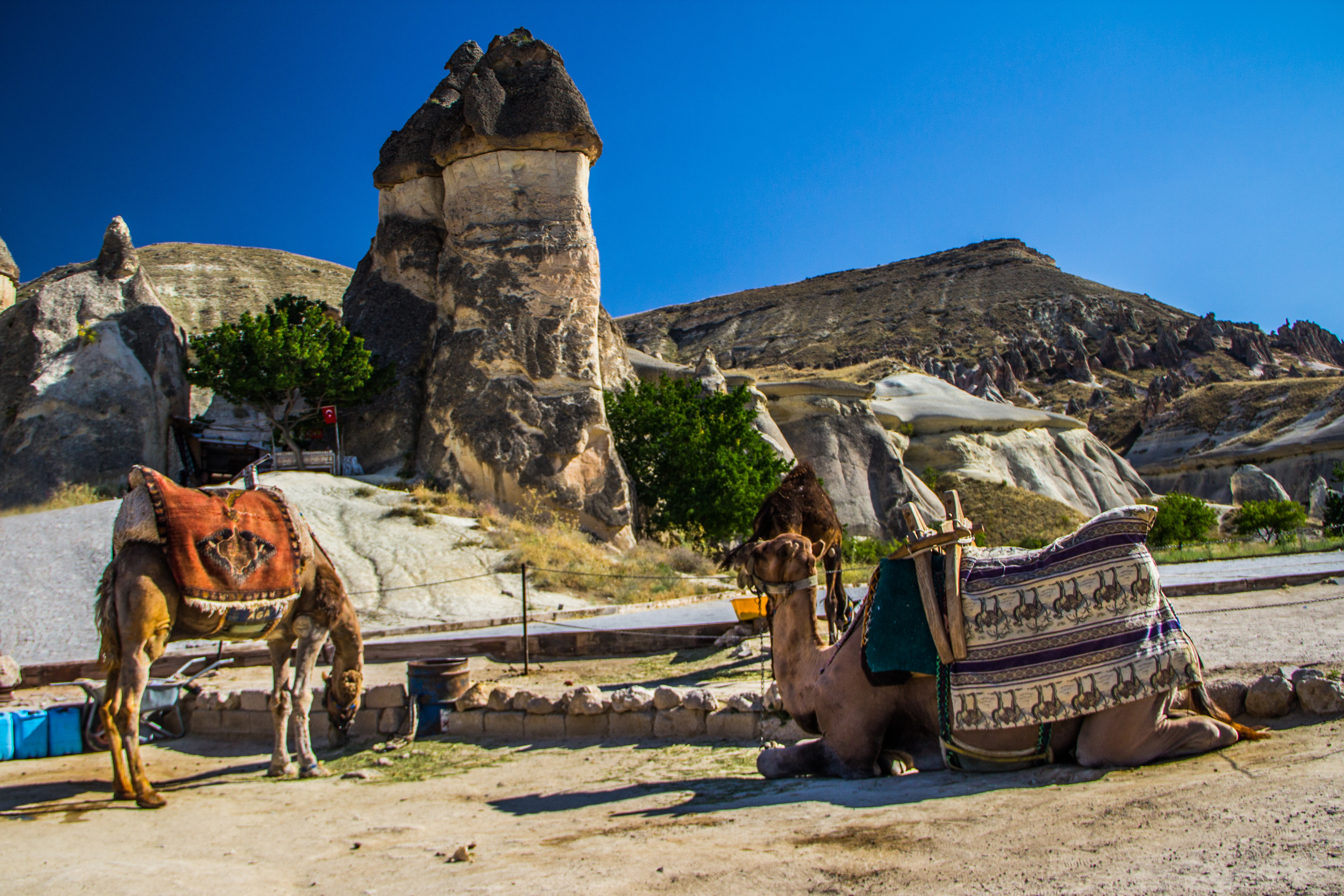
Camels in Çavuşin

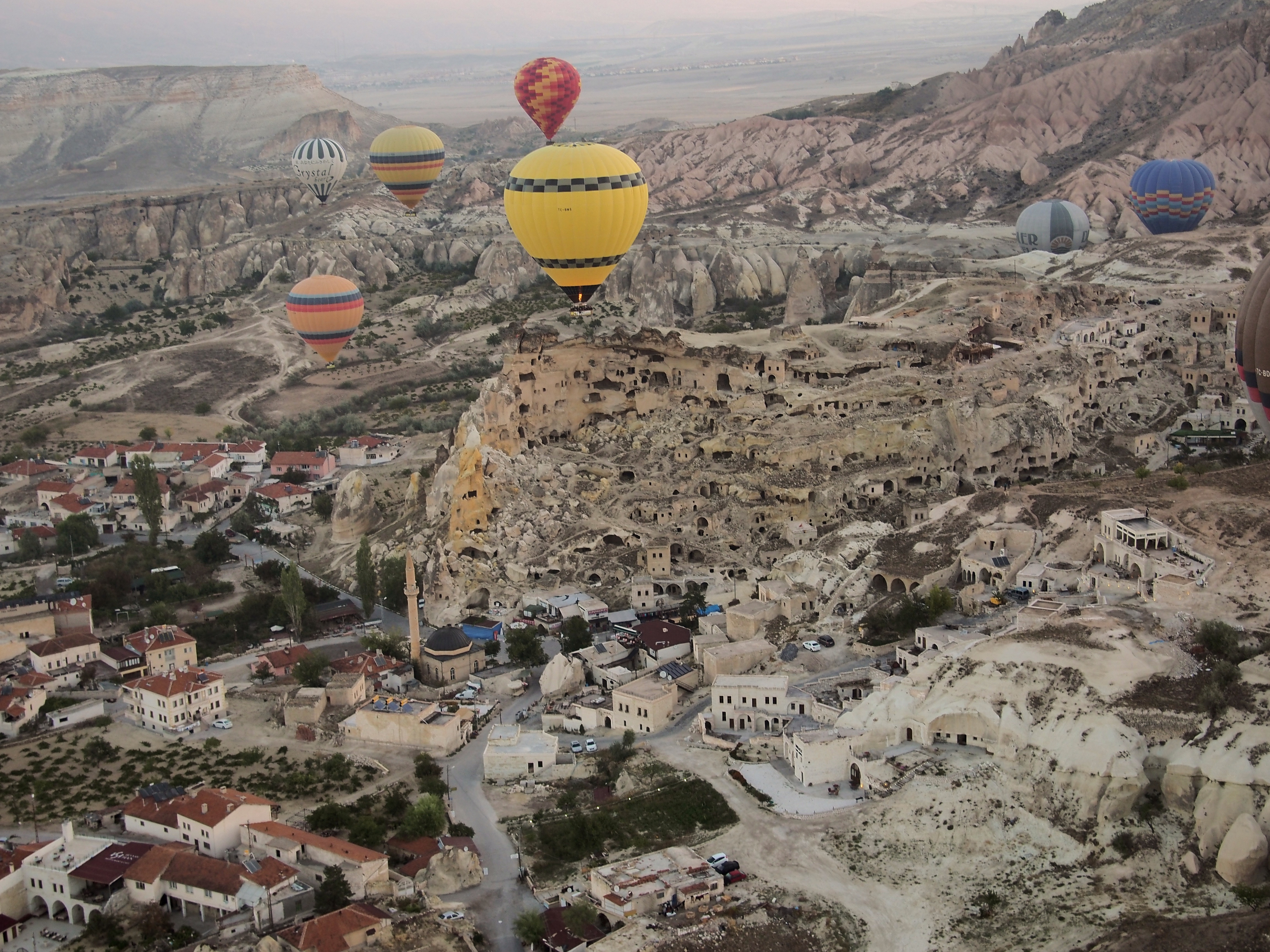
Balloons Flying over Çavuşin in 2014

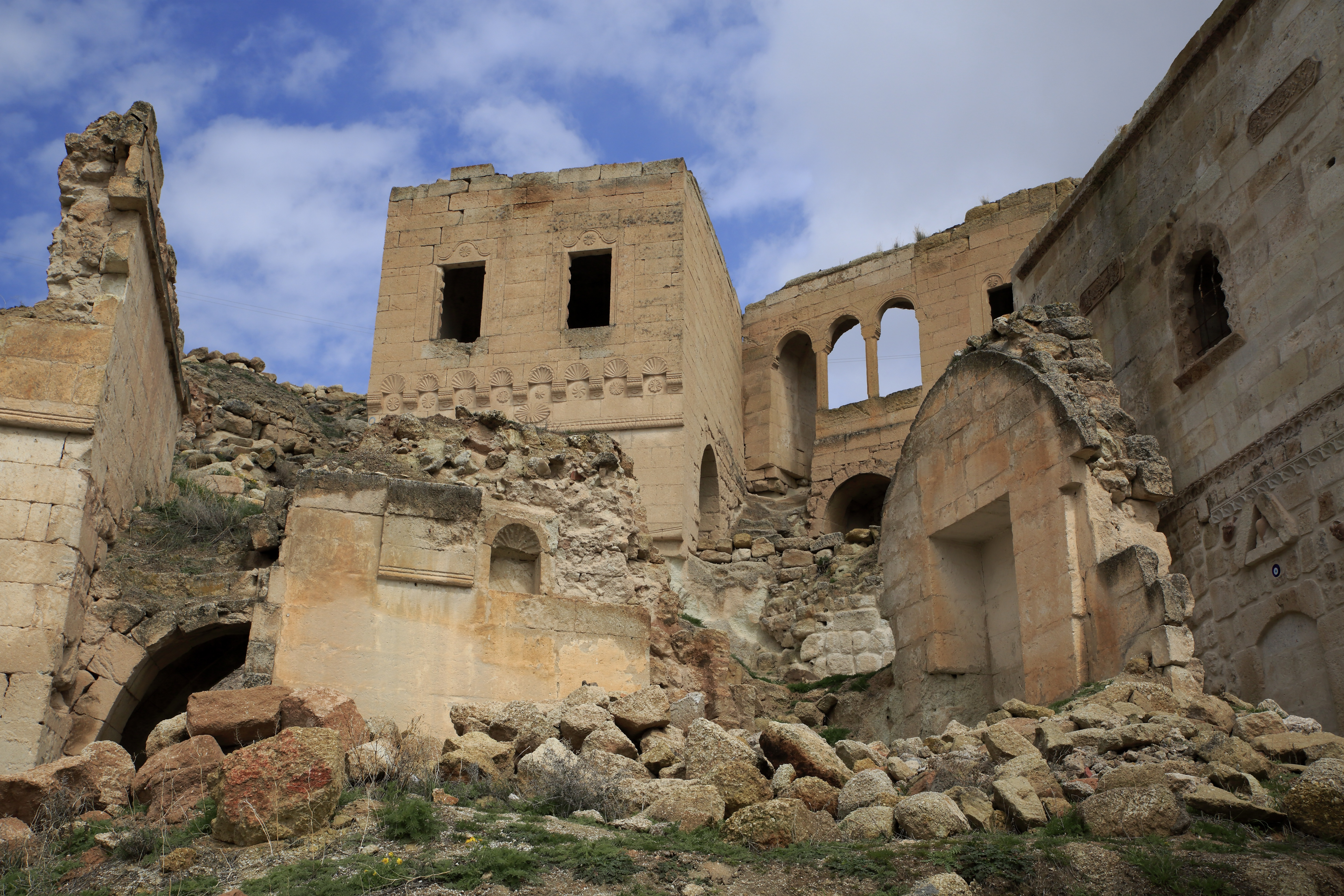
ruined houses in Çavuşin

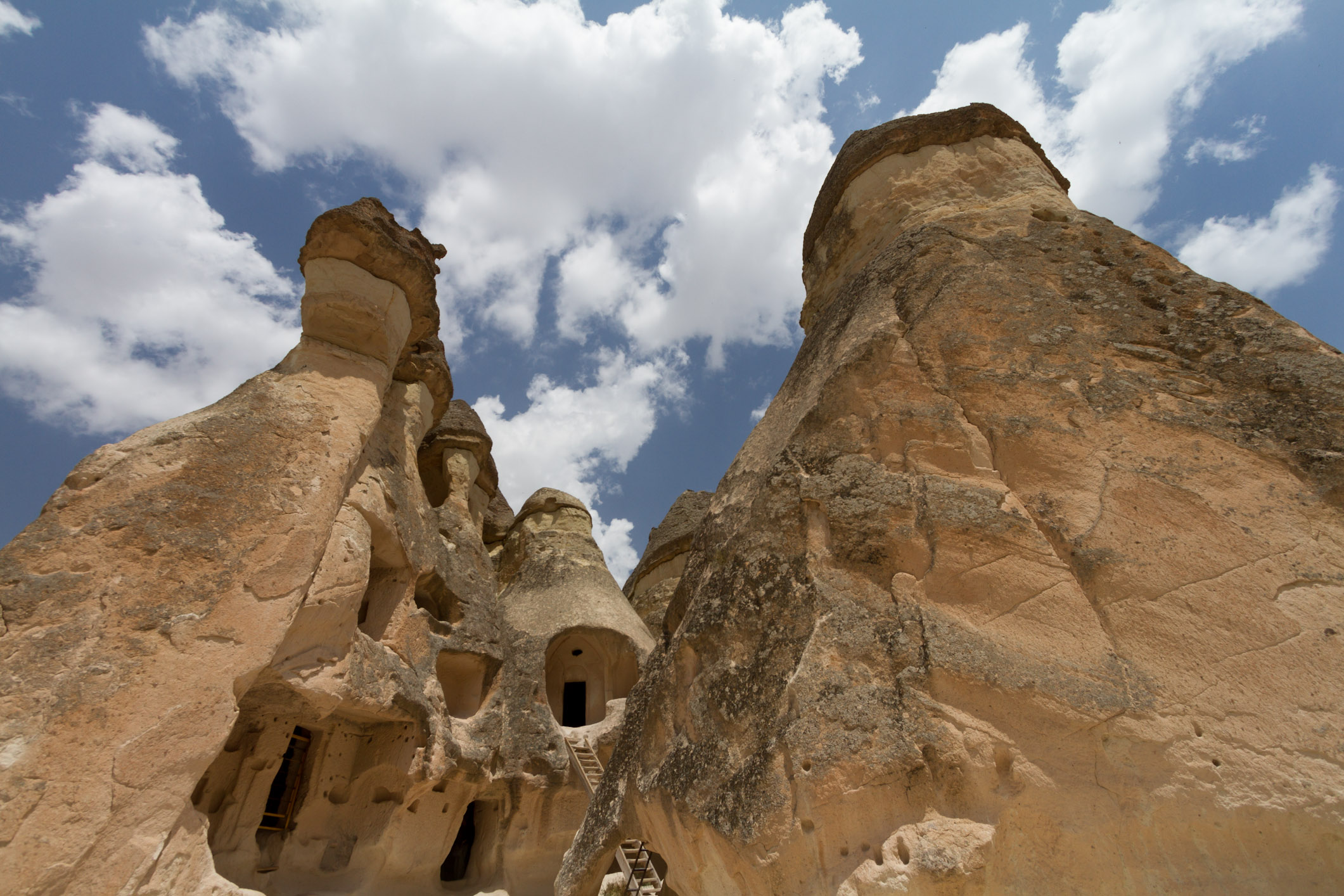
Rock-cut formations in Pasabag, also known as “Monks Valley” near Çavuşin

== See also ==
- Göreme Tarihî Millî Parkı
