= Derinkuyu =

- Municipality
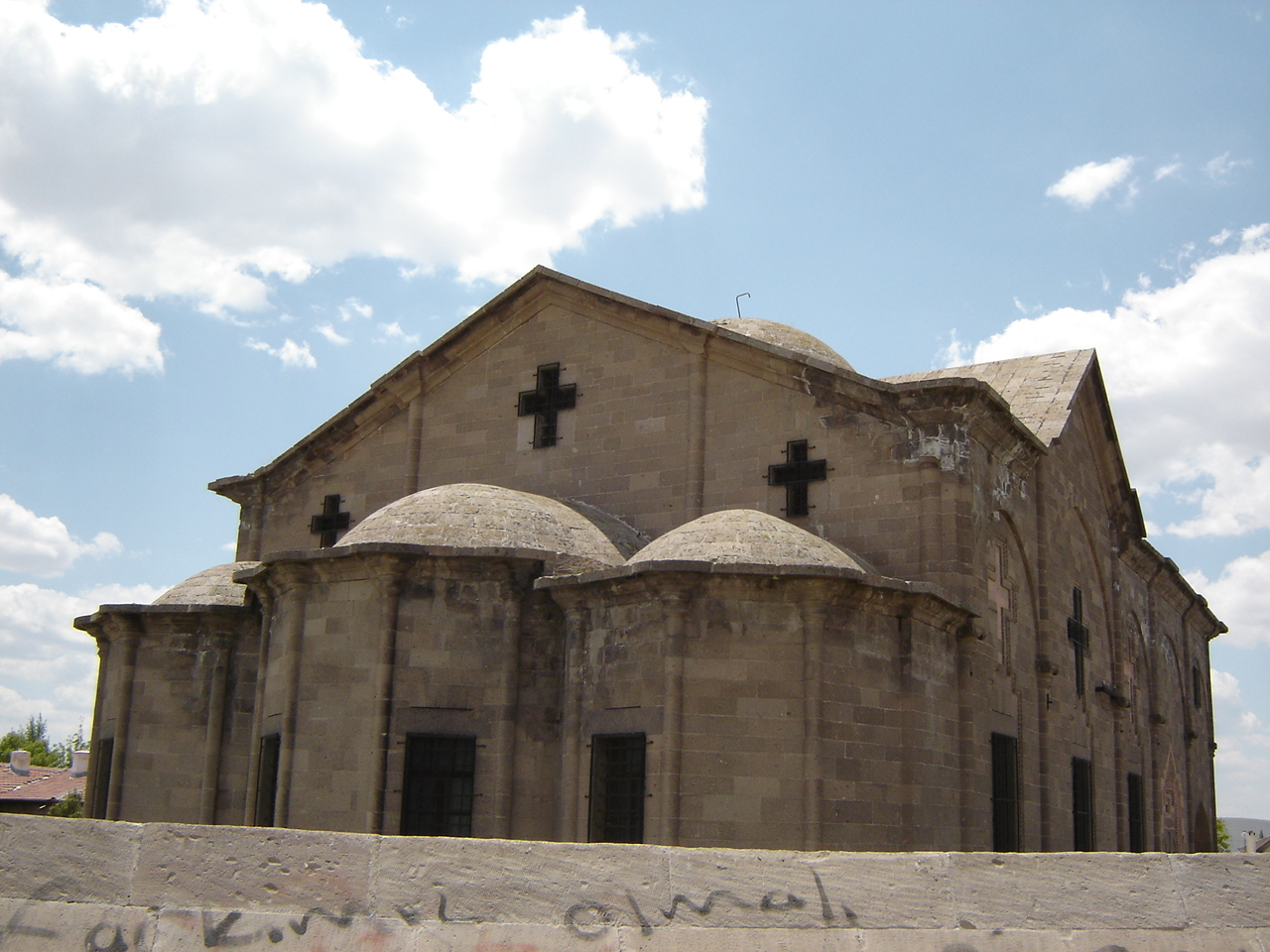
- St. Theodore Church also known as Üzümlü Kilise

- Location within Turkey Location within Turkey Central Anatolia
- Coordinates: 38°22′25″N 34°44′05″E
- Country: Turkey
- Province: Nevşehir
- District: Derinkuyu

Government
  - Mayor: Taner İnce (CHP)
- Elevation: 1,333 m (4,373 ft)
- Population (2022): 10,912
- Time zone: UTC+3 (TRT)
- Postal code: 50700
- Area code: 0384
- Climate: Csb
- Website: www.derinkuyu.bel.tr

Derinkuyu ("deep well") (Cappadocian Greek: Μαλακοπή; Latin: Malacopia) is a town in Nevşehir Province in the Central Anatolia region of Turkey. It is the seat of Derinkuyu District. Its population is 10,912 (2022). The town sits at an average elevation of 1,333 m (4,373 ft) above sea level.

== Geography ==
Located in Cappadocia, Derinkuyu is notable for its large multi-level underground city, which is a major tourist attraction. The historical region of Cappadocia, where Derinkuyu is situated, contains several historical underground cities, carved out of a unique geological formation. They are not generally occupied. Over 200 underground cities at least two levels deep have been discovered in the area between Kayseri and Nevşehir, with around 40 of those having at least three levels. The troglodyte cities at Derinkuyu and Kaymaklı are two of the best examples of underground dwellings.

The geomorphology of the area lends itself to underground construction. The soil is generally dry, and the tuff rock typical of the area is easy to work.

The city contained food stores, kitchens, stalls, churches, wine and oil presses, ventilation shafts, wells, and a religious school. The Derinkuyu underground city has at least eight levels constructed to a depth of 85 metres (279 ft) and could have sheltered thousands of people.

== History ==
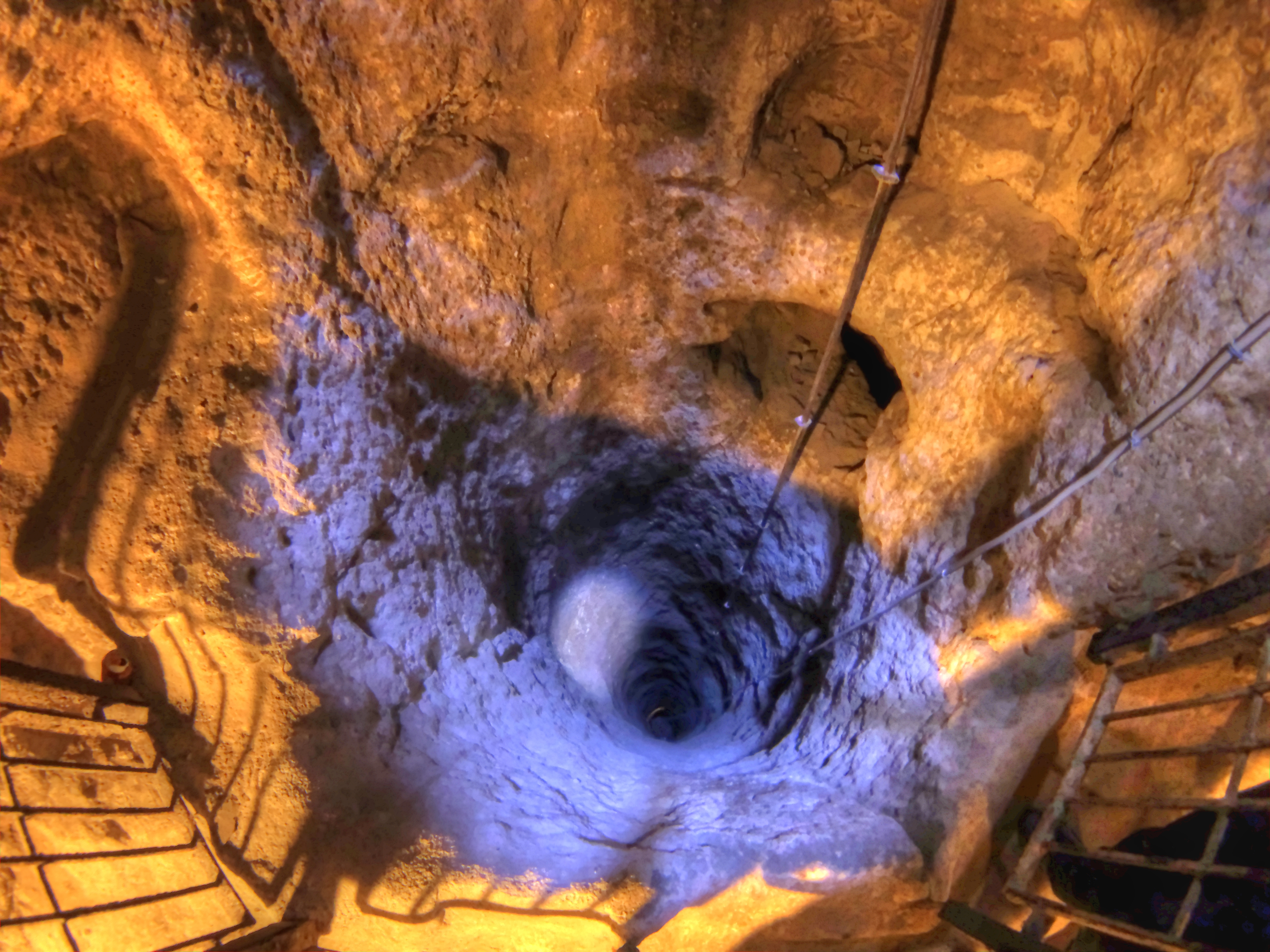
Deep ventilation well in Derinkuyu Underground City.

The oldest written information about underground structures is in the writings of Xenophon. In his Anabasis (circa 370 BC), he writes that the people living in Anatolia had excavated their houses underground, living well in accommodations large enough for the family, domestic animals, and supplies of stored food. The first two floors of the Derinkuyu underground city have been dated to this early period.

From Byzantine times (4th century AD) through 1923, Derinkuyu was known by its Cappadocian Greek inhabitants as Malakopea (Greek: Μαλακοπέα). The underground city was greatly expanded in the middle Byzantine period to serve as a refuge from the raids of the Umayyad Arab and Abbasid armies, during the Arab–Byzantine wars (780-1180). The city continued to be used as protection from the Mongolian incursions of Timur in the 14th century. After the region fell to the Ottomans the cities were used as refuges (Greek: καταφύγια). As late as the 20th century the town's inhabitants, called Cappadocian Greeks, were still using the underground chambers to escape periodic waves of Ottoman persecution.

Cambridge linguist Richard MacGillivray Dawkins] spent time in the towns from 1910-1911 while writing his book on Cappadocian Greek. He wrote:

"Their use as places of refuge in time of danger is indicated by their name καταφύγια, and when the news came of the recent massacres at Adana [in 1909], a great part of the population at Axo took refuge in these underground chambers, and for some nights did not venture to sleep above ground."

The Cappadocian Greeks were required to leave in 1923 in the population exchange between Greece and Turkey, and the tunnels were finally abandoned.

== Images ==
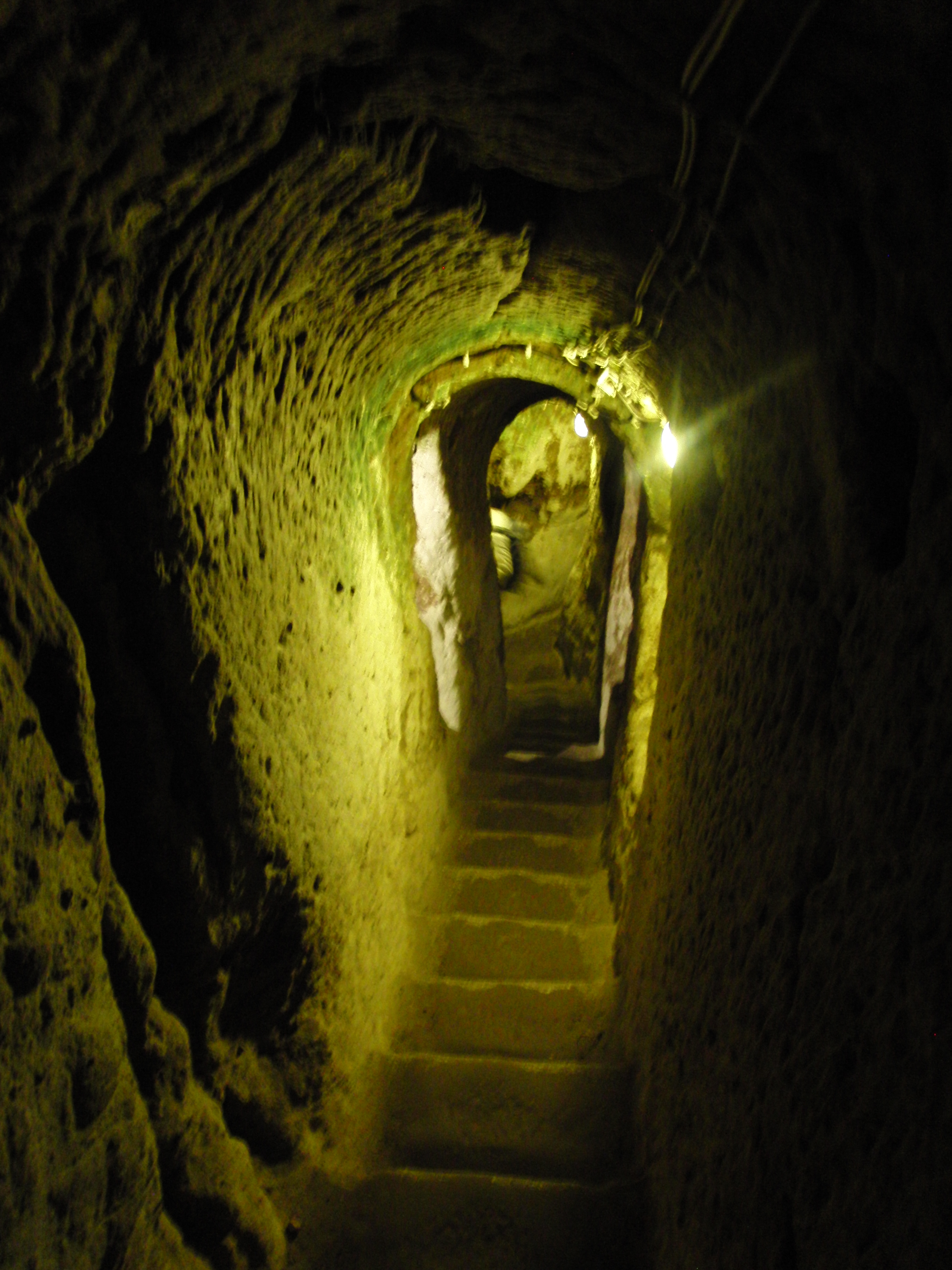
Staircase in the underground town of Derinkuyu, Cappadocia, Turkey

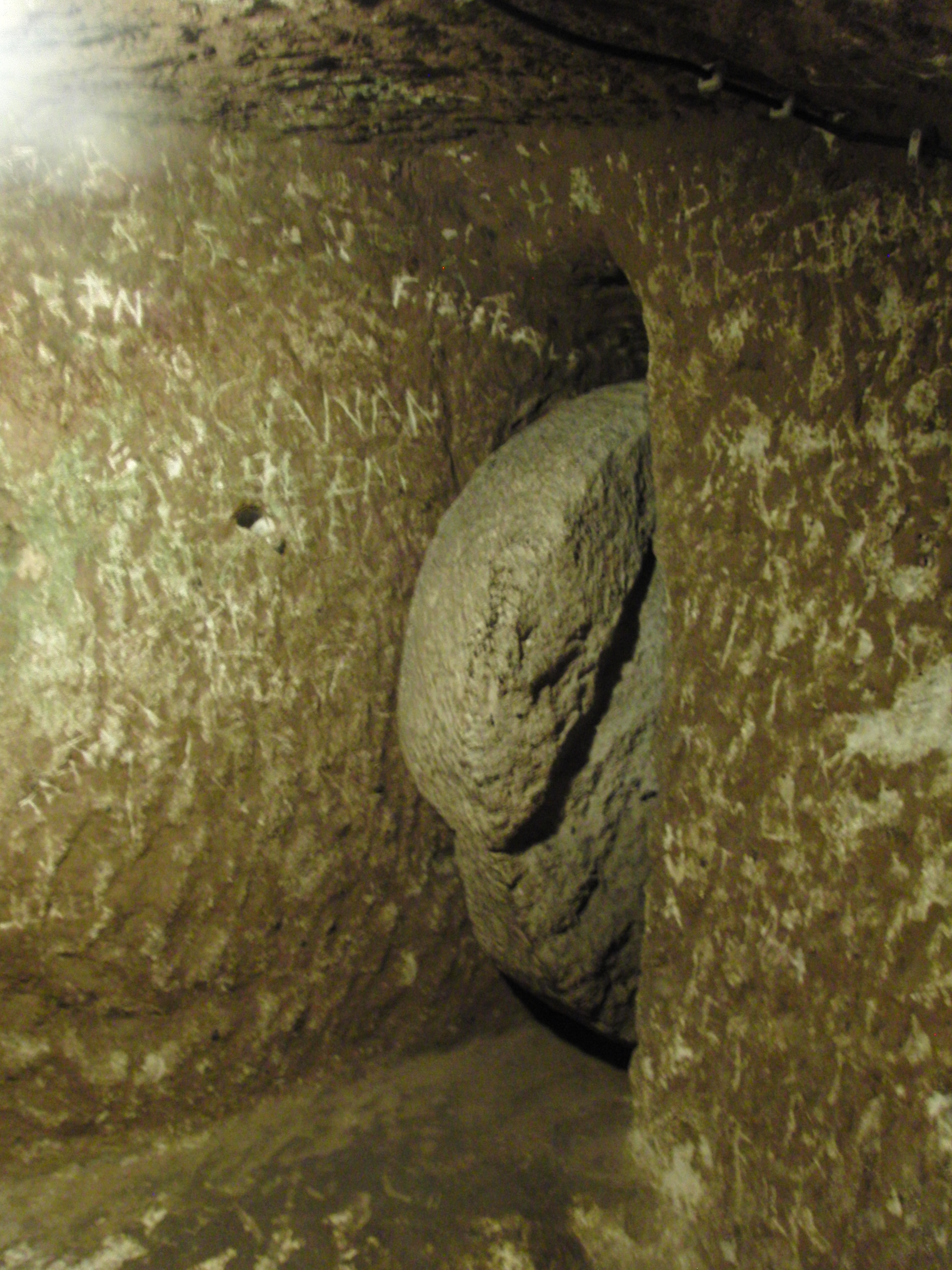
Rolling stone door in the underground town of Derinkuyu, Cappadocia, Turkey

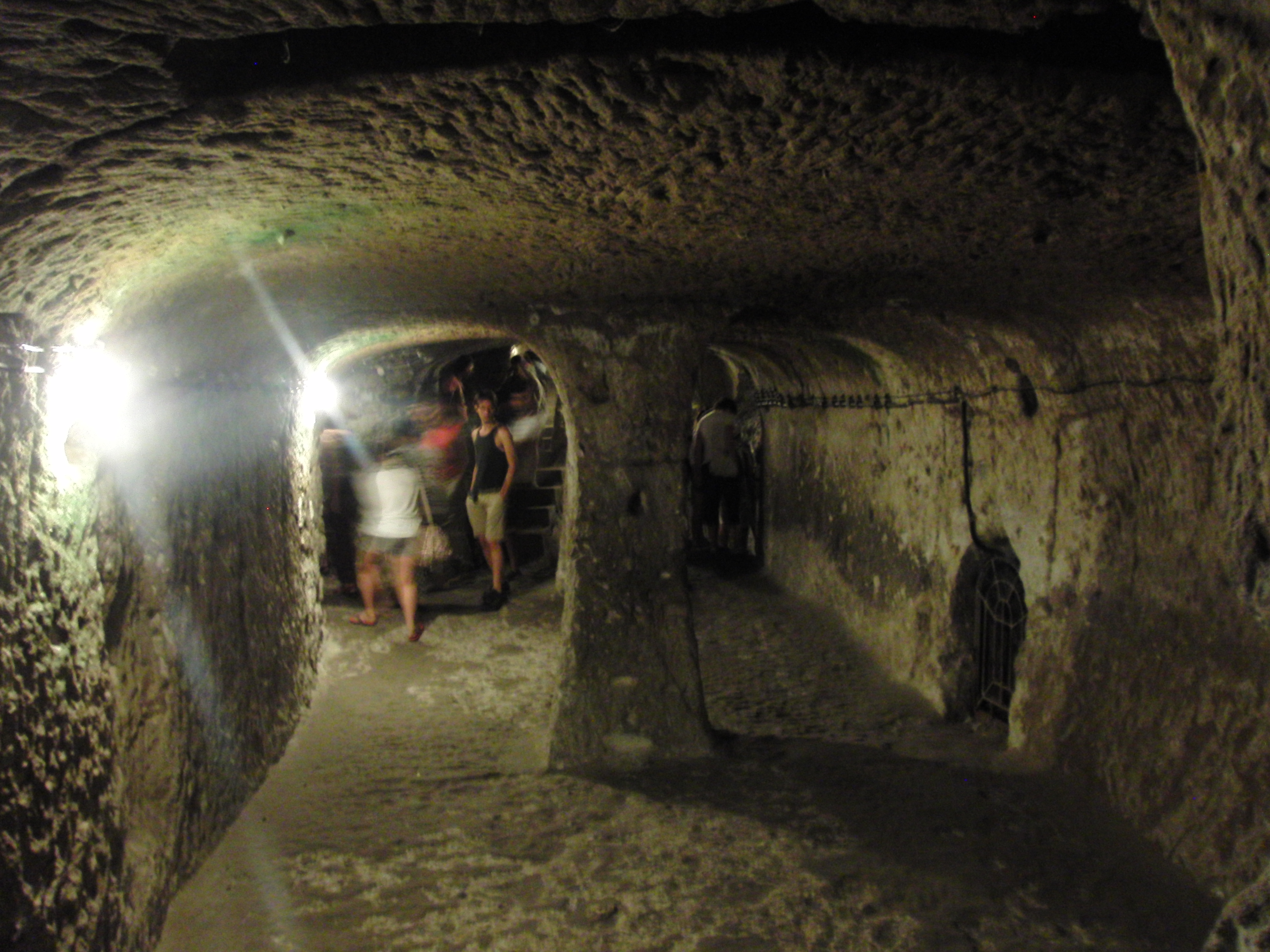
Chamber in the underground town of Derinkuyu, Cappadocia, Turkey

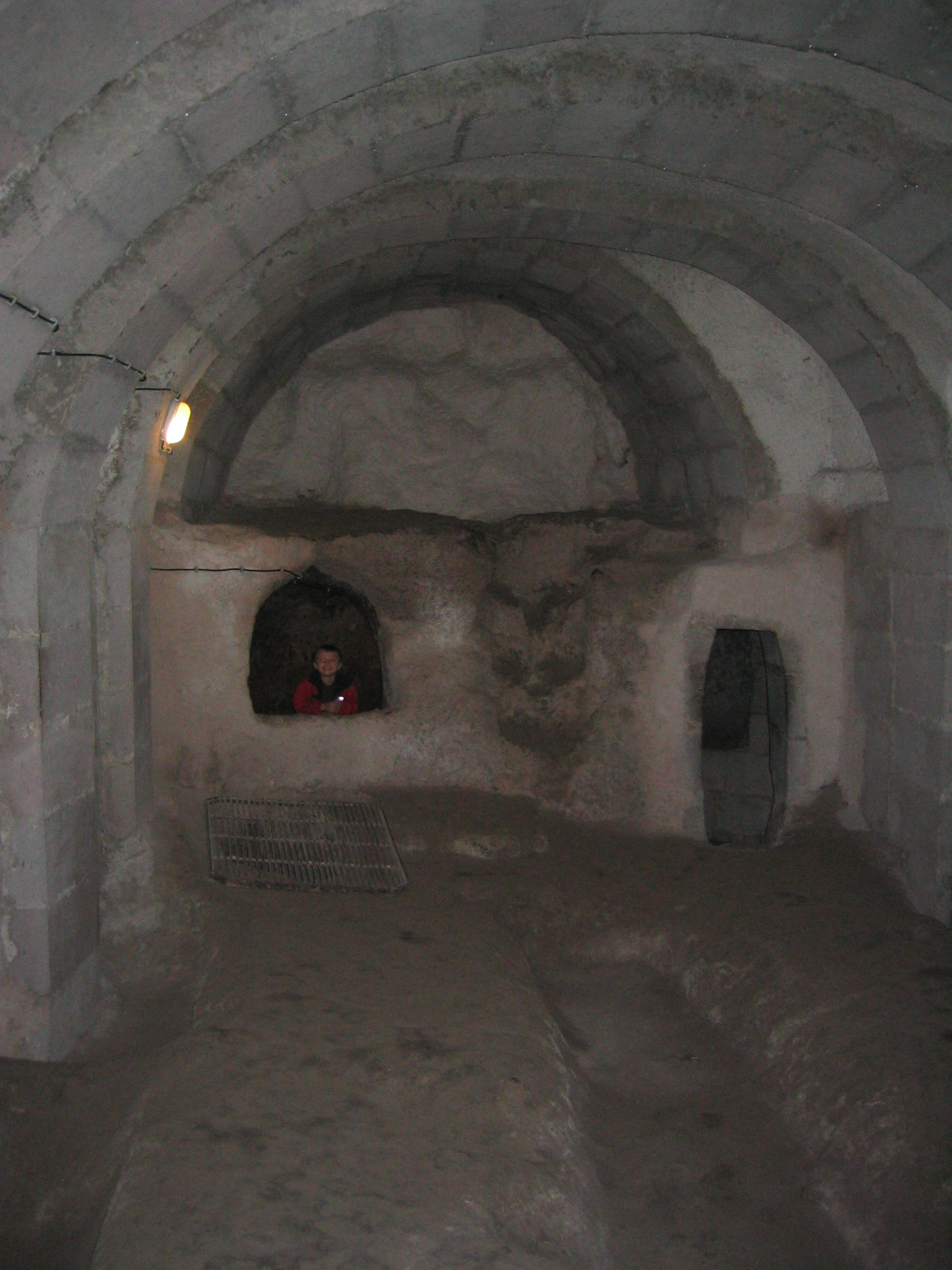
Large room near the final exit of the underground town of Derinkuyu, Cappadocia, Turkey

== See also ==
- Avanos
- Churches of Göreme, Turkey
- Eskigümüş Monastery
- Ihlara Valley
- Mokissos
- Özkonak Underground City
- Zelve Monastery
