= Zaman =

Zaman, an Arabic and Hebrew word (زمان or זמן) for time, era, or life may refer to:

== Organizations ==
- Zaman International School, Phnom Penh, Cambodia
- Zaman (newspaper), a Turkish newspaper with international editions
  - Today's Zaman, the English-language edition
- Zaman (Cyprus), Turkish Cypriot newspaper

== People ==
- Akramozzaman (Akram uz-Zaman), Meghalayan Bengali politician
- Arif Zaman, Pakistani mathematician
- Atiq-uz-Zaman (born 1975), Pakistani cricketer
- Azad Zaman (1973/74–2021), Meghalayan Bengali politician
- Baby Zaman (1923–2013), Bengali actor and producer
- Badar uz Zaman (1940–2023), Pakistani classical singer and musicologist
- Badruzzaman Badol (born 1969), Bangladeshi High Court justice
- C. B. Zaman (1945–2024), Bangladeshi film director, actor, and model
- Daulat Zaman (1947–2002), Bengali cricketer
- Dilara Zaman (born 1943), Bangladeshi actress
- Dina Zaman (born 1969), Malaysian writer
- Fakhar Zaman (poet) (born 1943), Pakistani poet and novelist
- Fakhar Zaman (cricketer) (born 1990), Pakistani cricketer
- Fakhruzzaman Chowdhury (1940–2014), Bangladeshi author
- Farhan Zaman (born 1992), Pakistani squash player
- Farrukh Zaman (born 1956), Pakistani cricketer
- Hisham Zaman (born 1975), Kurdish-Norwegian filmmaker
- Mansoor Zaman (born 1980), Pakistani squash player
- Mian Yawar Zaman (born 1961), Pakistani politician
- Mohammed Zaman (1965–2010), Afghan military leader and politician
- Muhammad Zaman (fl. 1680–1700), Persian calligrapher and painter
- Munawwaruz Zaman (1950–1994), Pakistani field hockey player
- Niaz Zaman, Bangladeshi academic
- Qamar Zaman (born 1952), Pakistani squash player
- Raja Sikander Zaman (1935–2007), Pakistani politician
- Rustam Zaman (fl. 1659), Bijapuri general
- Sabah uz Zaman, Pakistani State Bank officer
- Salman Zaman (born 1979), Bahraini rifle sport shooter
- Shahid Zaman (born 1982), Pakistani squash player
- Sultana Zaman (1935–2012), Bangladeshi film actress and producer
- Sultana Zaman (psychologist) (1932–2020), Bangladeshi psychologist, academic, and philanthropist
- Tahir Zaman (born 1969), Pakistani field hockey player
- Zaman Molla (born 1979), Iranian table tennis player
- Zaman Shah Durrani (1770–1844), ruler of the Durrani Empire from 1793 to 1800
- Mir Zaman Khan (1869–1929), Afghan hero of the 1919 Anglo-Afghan War

== Arabic-based compound names with Zaman as an element ==
- Akhtaruzzaman (disambiguation), meaning star of the era
- Asaduzzaman (disambiguation), meaning lion of the era
- Ashiquzzaman (disambiguation), meaning lover of the era
- Badi' al-Zaman (disambiguation), meaning wonder of the era
- Hasanuzzaman (disambiguation), meaning benefactor of the era
- Khaliquzzaman (disambiguation), meaning courteous of the era
- Khasruzzaman (disambiguation), meaning Chosroes of the era
- Nuruzzaman (disambiguation), meaning light of the era
- Qamar al-Zaman (disambiguation), meaning moon of the era
- Saifuzzaman (disambiguation), meaning sword of the era
- Shahiduzzaman (disambiguation), meaning witness of the era
- Shamsuzzaman (disambiguation), meaning sun of the era

== Places ==
- Zaman-e Sofla, a village in Kerman Province, Iran
- Zaman Town, a neighborhood of Korangi Town, Karachi, Sindh, Pakistan

== Other uses ==
- Shah Zaman (One Thousand and One Nights), a character in the folk tale One Thousand and One Nights
- Zaman (album), a 2002 album by Lebanese singer Amal Hijazi
  - "Zaman" (song)
- Zaman people, one of the Beti-Pahuin ethnic groups of Cameroon

== See also ==
- Zamana (disambiguation)
- Saman (disambiguation)
- Zama (disambiguation)
- Zman (disambiguation)
