= Derinkuyu underground city =

Ancient underground city in Turkey

Coordinates: 38°22′25″N 34°44′06″E

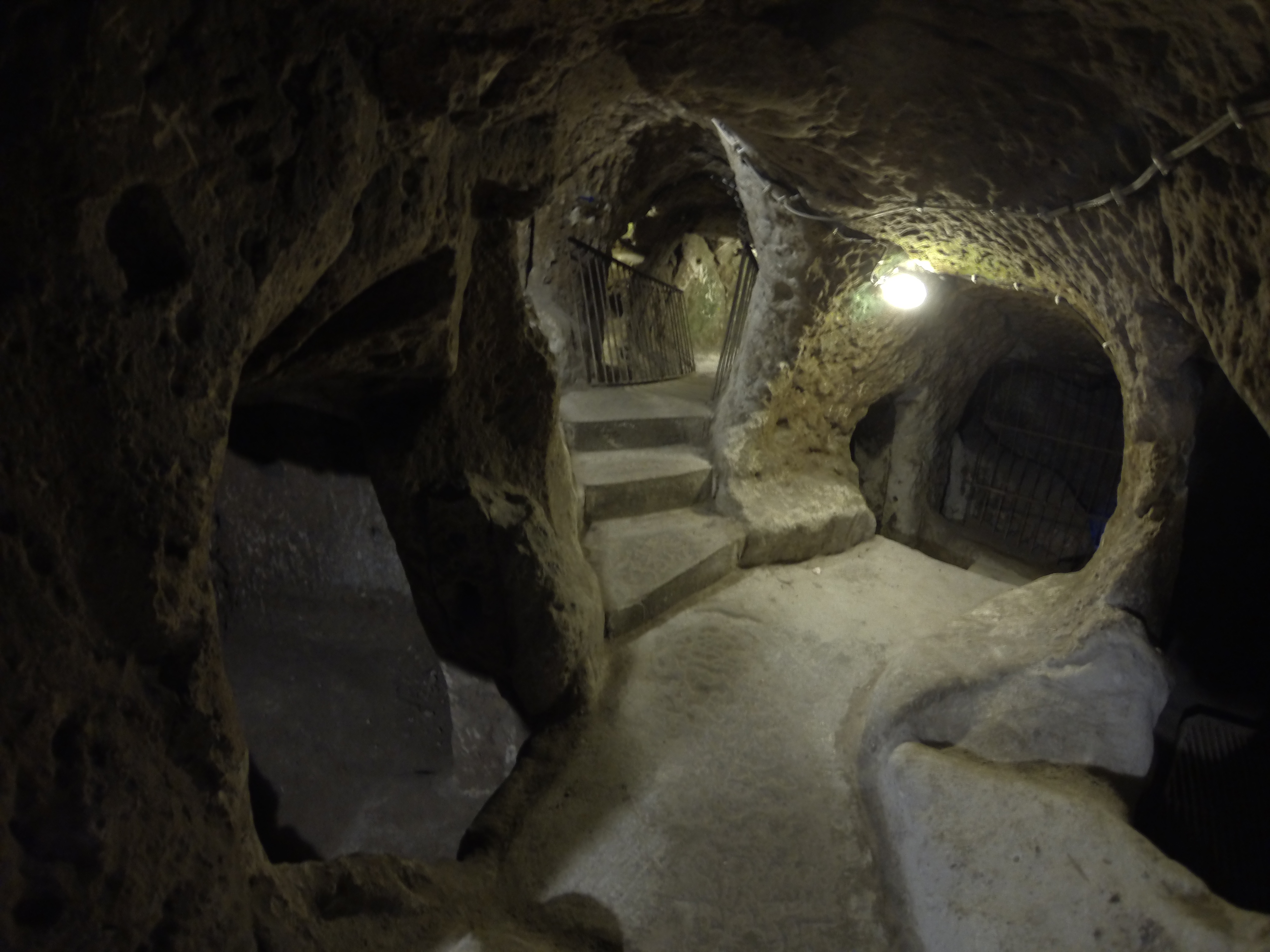
- A passage in the underground city
- Type: Underground City
- Cultures: Phrygians, Byzantines, Christians, Cappadocian Greeks, Armenians
- Location: Derinkuyu, Nevşehir Province, Turkey
- Region: Cappadocia

History
- Built: 8th-7th century BC
- Built by: Phrygians
- Abandoned: 1924

Site notes
- Material: Carved volcanic rock tuff
- Public access: Yes

UNESCO World Heritage Site
- Official name: Göreme National Park and the Rock Sites of Cappadocia
- Type: Mixed
- Criteria: Cultural: (i)(iii)(v); Natural: (vii)
- Designated: 1985 (9th session)
- Reference no.: 357

Derinkuyu (Turkish pronunciation: [deˈɾinkuju]) (Note: in full Derinkuyu Yeraltı Şehri) (Note: Cappadocian Greek: Μαλακοπή, romanized: Malakopi), also known as Malakopi, is an ancient multi-level underground city near the modern town of Derinkuyu in Nevşehir Province, Turkey, extending to a depth of approximately 85 metres (280 ft). It is large enough to have sheltered as many as 20,000 people together with their livestock and food stores. It is the largest excavated underground city in Turkey and is one of several underground complexes found throughout Cappadocia.

== Etymology ==

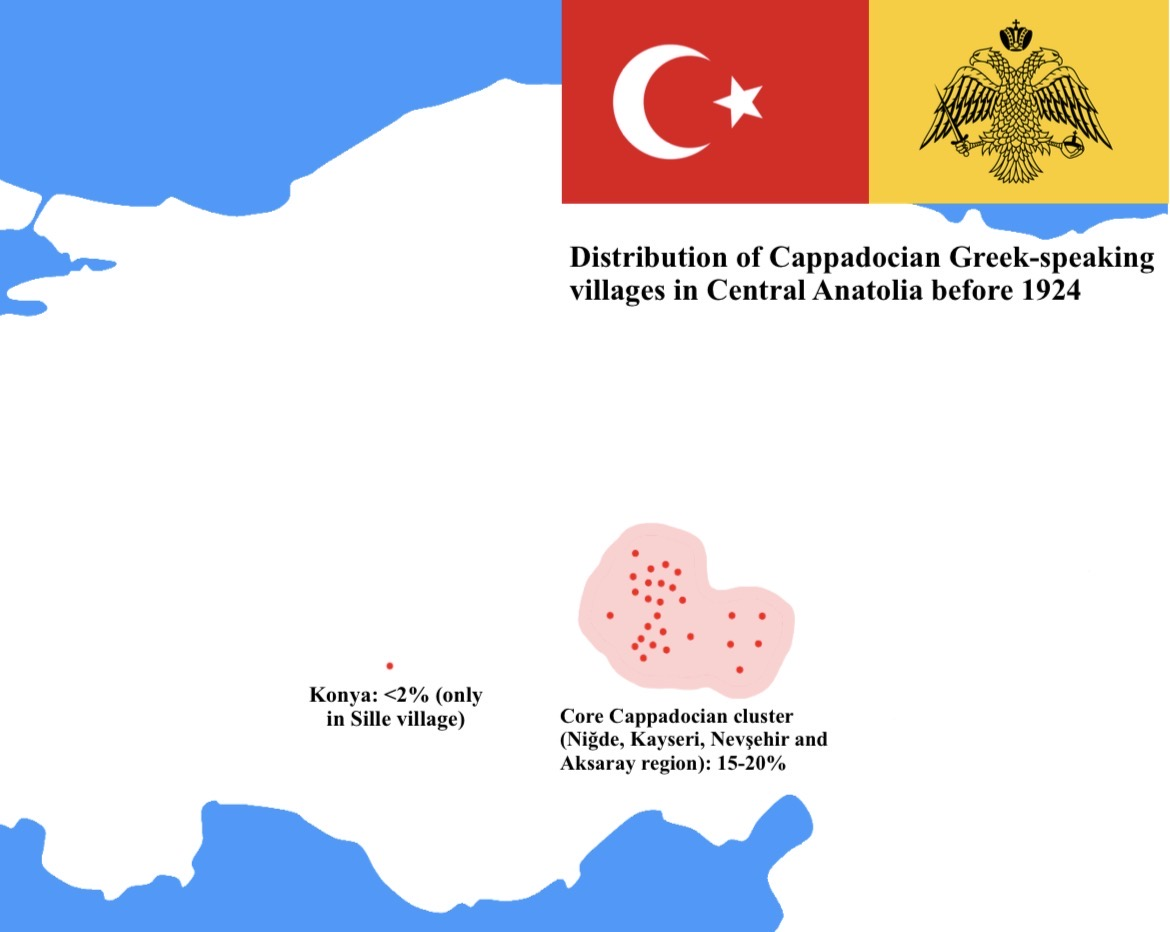
Remaining Cappadocian Greek-speaking villages before 1924 deportations.

The name Derinkuyu means "deep well", after the deep shafts that once supplied the settlement and the town above it with water. It was known to Cappadocian Greek speakers as Malakopia (Μαλακοπέα) (also recorded in Turkish as Melagobia or Melegobi), a name plausibly related to Greek μαλακός (malakos, "soft"), in reference to the easily worked local tuff.

== Architecture ==
The underground city at Derinkuyu was carved mostly into tuff, a rock formed from compacted volcanic ash which is widespread in the region. It could be closed from the inside with large rolling stone doors. Each floor could be closed off separately. The city could accommodate up to 20,000 people and had amenities found in other underground complexes across Cappadocia, such as wine and oil presses, stables, cellars, storage rooms, refectories, and chapels. The kitchens were equipped with ovens called "Tandoor", which are still used in the villages of Cappadocia today. Unique to the Derinkuyu complex is a spacious room with a barrel-vaulted ceiling located on the second floor. It has been reported that this room was used as a religious school and the rooms to the left were studies.

Starting between the third and fourth levels are a series of staircases, which led to a church on the lowest (fifth) level.

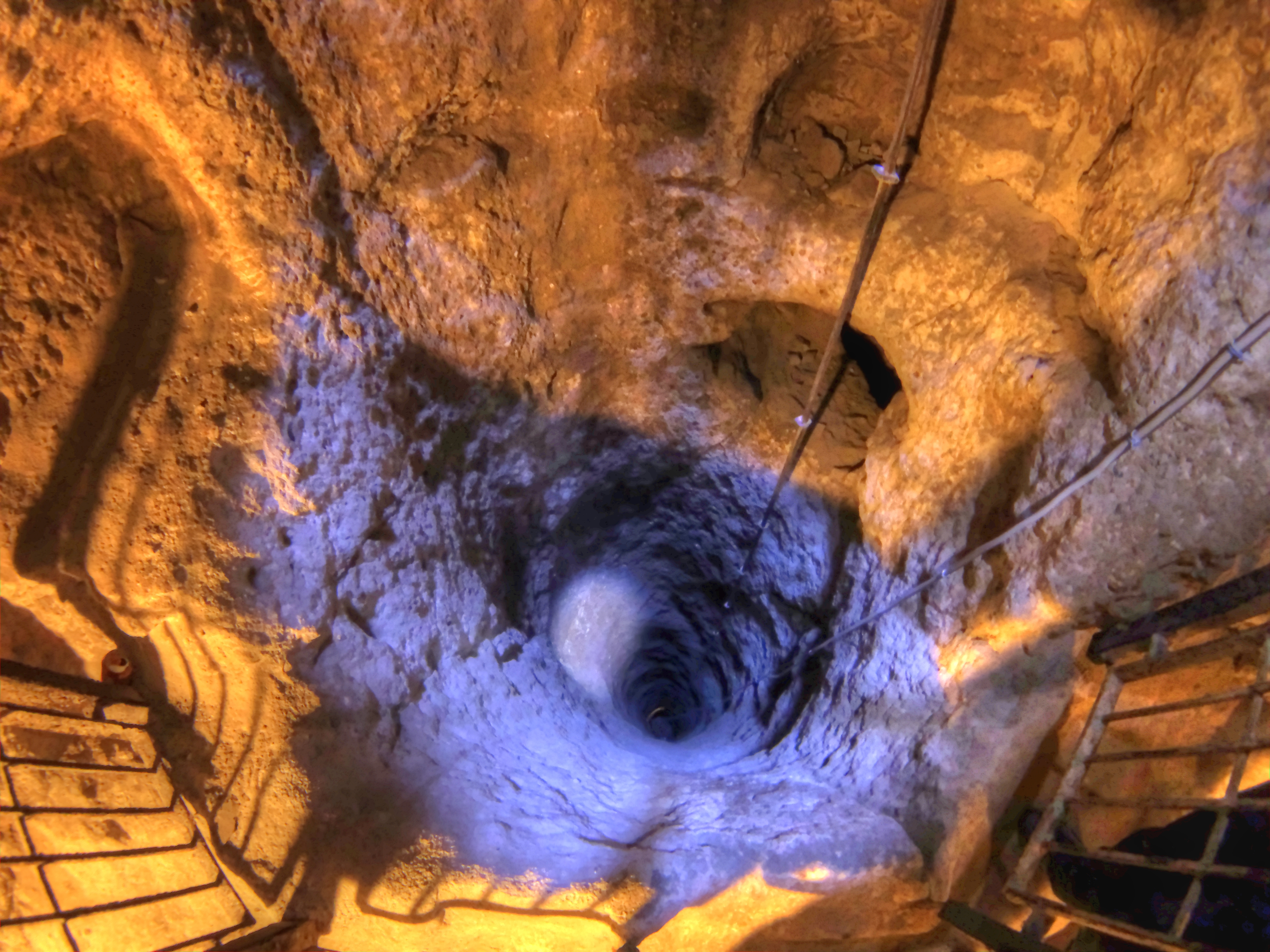
A deep ventilation well in the city

The complex possesses a large amount of vertical ventilation shafts, divided into smaller air vents that link living quarters and other individual rooms to the wider central shafts. A 55-metre (180 ft) shaft appears to have been used as a well, providing water to both the villagers above and, if the outside world was not accessible, to those in hiding. The main central shaft which measures roughly 3 m by 2.8 m and connects to several levels, never has the openings of two different levels overlapping one another, in a layout that appears deliberately engineered to maximise airflow.

== History ==
Tunnels and rooms might initially have been cut into the soft volcanic rock of the Cappadocia region by the Phrygians, in the 8th-7th century BC. Much later during the Christian period of the Late Roman Empire, the inhabitants expanded their caverns to deep multiple-level structures to escape Roman persecution, adding the chapels and Greek inscriptions. (Note: "The area became an important frontier province during the 7th century when Arab raids on the Byzantine Empire began. By now the soft tufa had been tunneled and chambered to provide underground cities where a settled if cautious life could continue during difficult times. When the Byzantines re-established secure control between the 7th and 11th centuries, the troglodyte population surfaced, now carving their churches into rock faces and cliffs in the Goreme and Soganli areas, giving Cappadocia its fame today. ... At any rate here they flourished, their churches remarkable for being cut into the rock, but interesting especially for their paintings, relatively well preserved, rich in coloring, and with an emotional intensity lacking in the formalism of Constantinople; this is one of the few places where paintings from the pre-iconoclastic period have survived. Icons continued to be painted after the Seljuk conquest of the area in the 11th century, and the Ottoman conquest did not interfere with the Christian practices in Cappadocia, where the countryside remained largely Greek, with some Armenians. But decline set in and Goreme, Ihlara and Soganli lost their early importance. The Greeks finally ending their long history here with the mass exchange of populations between Turkey and Greece in 1923." — Darke (2011))

The city at Derinkuyu was fully formed in the Byzantine era. The city was connected with another underground city, Kaymakli, through 8–9 km (5.0–5.6 mi) of tunnels. Inhabitants dug deeper and carved out tunnels, chapels, a school, into what had previously been simpler cave homes. The city was significantly enlarged during the Arab–Byzantine wars from roughly 780 to 1180, when it sheltered the local Christians from Umayyad and later Abbasid raider armies. The site's defensive underground design permitted not only concealment but the isolation of individual sections, internal movement of inhabitants, and even organised counterattacks if part of the city was breached. It was likely during this period that Derinkuyu's population came closest to its peak capacity of around 20,000 people.

The underground cities of Cappadocia continued to be used by Christians for protection from the Seljuk invasions of the area in the 11th century and the Mongolian incursions of Timur in the 14th century. The population continued to surface and build above ground during peaceful periods, but returned to the underground cities in times of danger. (Note: "Its inhabitants were Cappadocian Greeks, who may have found a refuge here, perhaps from Roman, from Iconoclast, or later from Turkish and Mongol threats. Urgup itself was the Byzantine Prokopion; the Emperor Nicephoros Phocas is said to have passed this way, after his Cilician campaign; and the neighborhood was populous enough to support, at different times, a number of bishoprics." — P.B. Kinross (1970)) (Note: "... these excavations are referred to as long ago as the campaigns of Timour Beg, one of whose captains was sent to hunt out the inhabitants of Kaisariyeh, who had taken refuge in their underground dwellings, and was killed by an arrow shot through the hole in one of the doors." — Dawkins (1916))

In the 20th century, the underground cities were still used by Cappadocian Greeks and Armenians to escape periodic persecutions. Richard MacGillivray Dawkins, a Cambridge linguist who conducted research from 1909 to 1911 on the Cappadocian Greek-speaking population in the area, recorded such an event as having occurred in 1909: "When the news came of the recent massacres at Adana, a great part of the population at Axo took refuge in these underground chambers, and for some nights did not venture to sleep above ground."

After the region fell to the Ottomans, the local Christian population used cities as refuges (Cappadocian Greek: καταφύγια) from the Turkish rulers. (Note: "... their use as places of refuge in time of danger is indicated by their name καταφύγια, and when the news came of the recent massacres at Adana [in 1909], a great part of the population at Axo took refuge in these underground chambers, and for some nights did not venture to sleep above ground." — Dawkins (1916))

In 1923, the Christian inhabitants of the region were expelled from Turkey and moved to Greece in the population exchange between Greece and Turkey, whereupon the underground city was abandoned. (Note: "The tenth-century historian Leo the Deacon records a journey to Cappadocia made by Nikephoros Phokas shortly before he became emperor. Perhaps to recapture the attention of readers beginning to tire of troop movements he also offers a scrap of information about a curiosity of the region to which the emperor was heading: its inhabitants were once called troglodytes, because ‘they went underground in holes, clefts and labyrinths, as it were in dens and burrows’. This brief note was probably not based on first-hand knowledge but it might have been prompted by an awareness of the vast number of rock-cut cavities in an area to the west and southwest of Kaisareia (Kayseri in modern Turkey). Had Leo been more inclined to garrulous digression (or perhaps just better informed), he might have supplied more details of the troglodyte region and the task of bringing scholarly order to the hundreds of rock-cut monuments and other cavities in the area might have been much similar. ... At this time the region was still inhabited by a mixed population of Turkish-speaking Moslems and Greek-speaking Christians. The latter group left for Greece in the early 1920s, during an exchange of population of minorities that was part of the radical social re-ordering initiated by Kemal Atatürk; they were replaced by Turks from Greece, mostly from Thrace. In the two decades before this upheaval, however, members of the local Greek population acted as guides to Guillaume de Jerphanion, who made several visits to the volcanic valleys and wrote his meticulous descriptions of many painted Byzantine rock-cut churches." — Rodley (2010)) (Note: "On May 1st, 1923, the agreement on the exchange of the Turkish and Greek minorities in both countries was published. A shock went through the ranks of the people affected – on both sides. Within a few months they had to pack their belongings and ship them or even sell them. They were to leave their homes, which had also been their great-grandfathers’ homes, they were to give up their holy places and leave the graves of their ancestors to an uncertain fate. In Cappadocia, the villages of Mustafapasa, Urgup, Guzelyurt and Nevşehir were the ones affected most by this rule. Often more than half the population of a village had to leave the country, so that those places were hardly able to survive… The Greeks from Cappadocia were taken to Mersin on the coast in order to be shipped to Greece from there. But they had to leave the remaining part of their belongings behind in the harbor. They were actually promised that everything would be sent after them later, but corrupt officials and numberless thieves looted the crammed storehouses, so that after a few months only a fraction of the goods – or even nothing at all – arrived at their new home ... . Today the old houses of the Greek people are the only testimony that reminds us of them in Cappadocia. But these silent witnesses are in danger, too. Only a few families can afford the maintenance of those buildings ... ." — Oberheu & Wadenpohl (2010))

Knowledge of the city faded until 1963, when it was rediscovered after a resident of the area, while renovating his home, knocked through a basement wall and found a mysterious room behind it. Further digging revealed an access to the tunnel network. More than 600 separate tunnel entrances to the complex have since been discovered, some concealed under the basements of private houses in the above town.

== Gallery ==
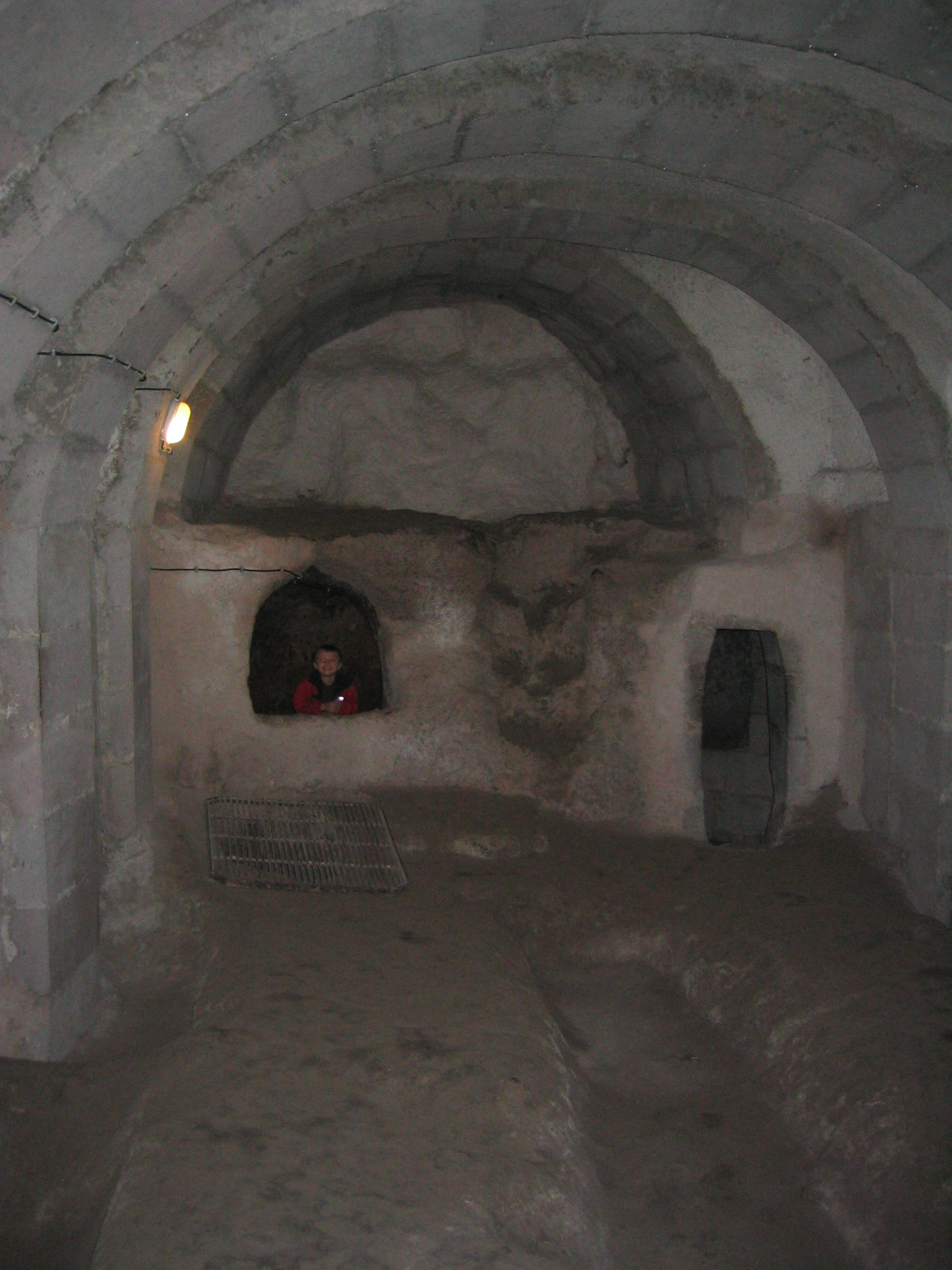
The room with the barrel-vaulted ceiling, possibly a school

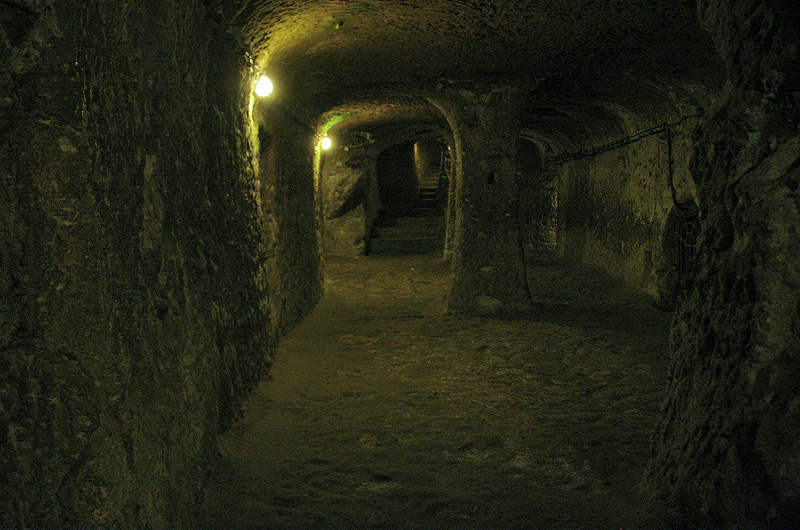
A corridor

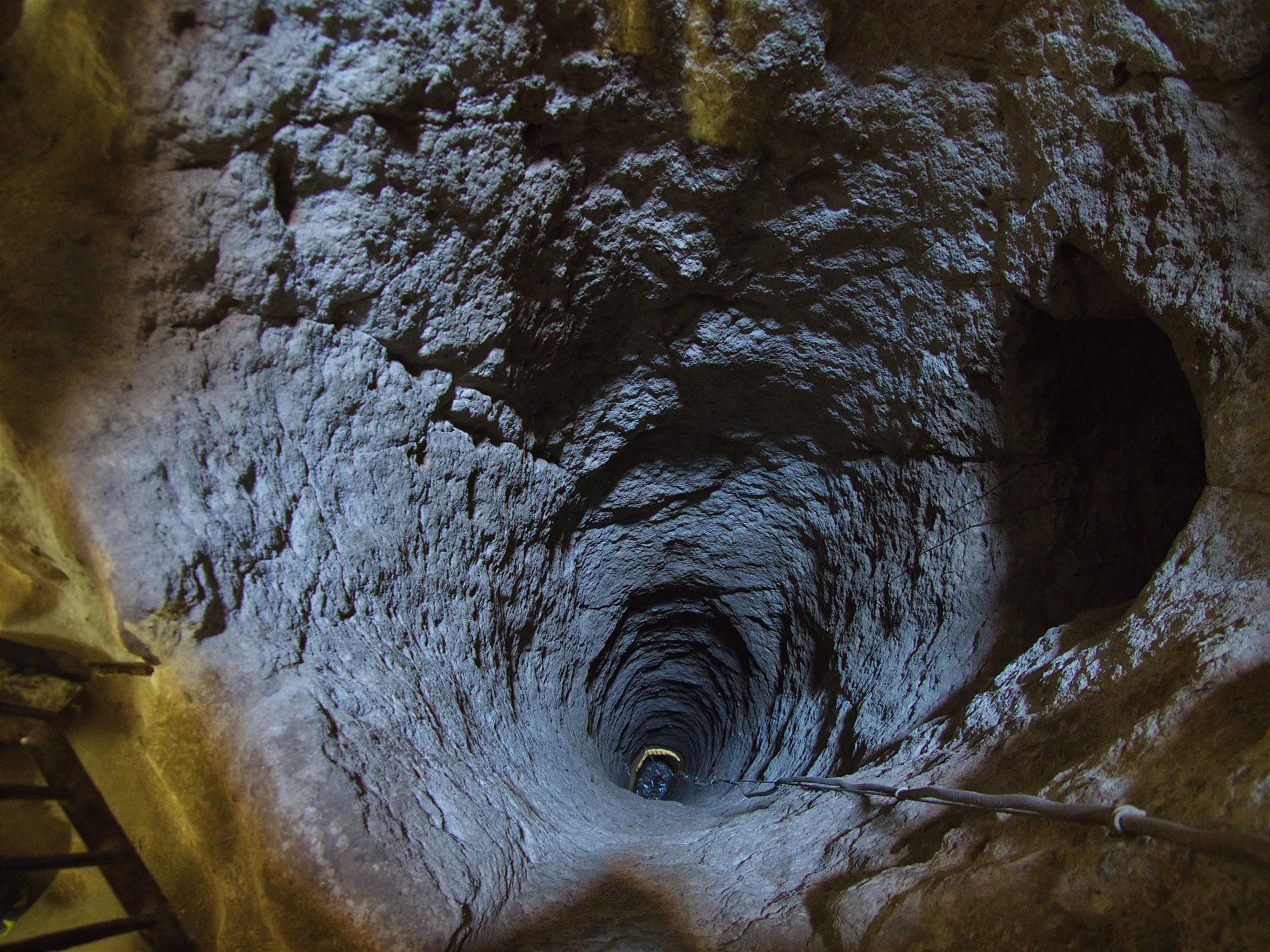
A ventilation well

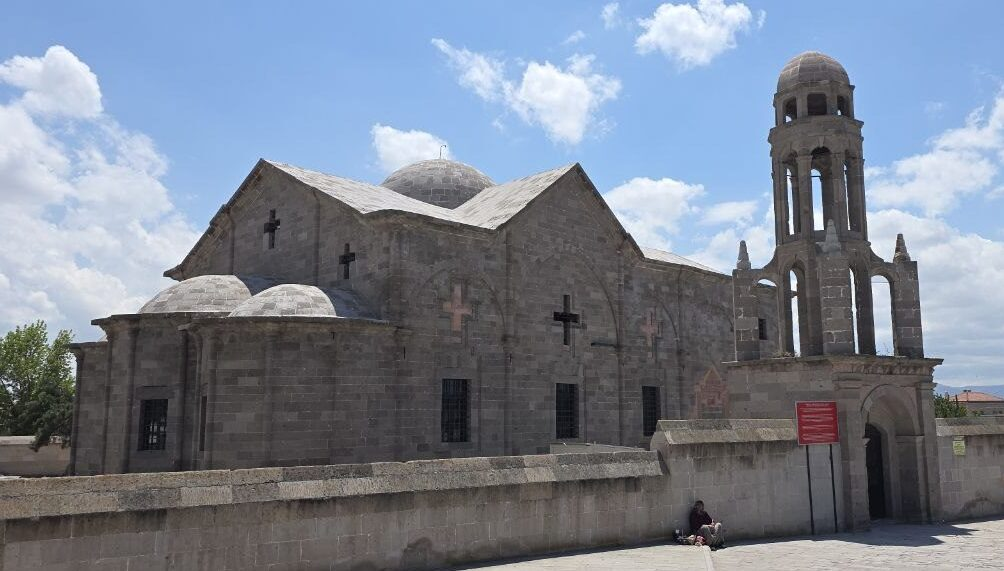
The surface Church above the city

== See also ==
- Avanos
- Churches of Göreme, Turkey – Archaeological sites in Turkey
- Eskigümüş Monastery – Monastery near Niğde, Turkey
- Göbekli Tepe – Neolithic archaeological site in Turkey
- Ihlara Valley – Valley in Aksaray Province, Turkey
- Mokissos – Town of ancient Cappadocia
- Özkonak underground city – Ancient city in Turkey
- Petra – Ancient rock-cut historical city in Jordan
- Zelve Monastery – Byzantine-era monastery in Turkey

== Bibliography ==
- Kostof, Spiro (1989). Caves of God: Cappadocia and Its Churches. Oxford University Press. ISBN 978-0-19-506000-3.
