= Qamar =

Qamar (Arabic: قمر) is a unisex given name and surname of Arabic origin, which means "moon", "natural satellite", or "moonlight". The word may also be transliterated as "Kamar".

Notable people with the name include:

== Given name ==
- Qamar Abbas (born 1989), Pakistani wrestler
- Qamar Adegoke (born 2004), Nigerian footballer
- Qamar Ahmed (1937–2026), Pakistani cricketer and journalist
- Qamarul Ahsan, Bengali politician and litterateur
- Qamar Ajnalvi (1919–1993), Pakistani novelist, poet, and movies script and story writer
- Qamar Ali Akhoon (1957–2026), Indian politician
- Qamar Alam (born 1968), Indian politician
- Qamar Aden Ali (1957–2009), Somali lawyer and politician
- Qamar Javed Bajwa (born 1960), Pakistani four-star general
- Qamar Dagar, Indian calligrapher
- Qamar David (died 2011), Pakistani Christian convicted of blasphemy
- Qamar Gula (1952–2022), Afghan Canadian musician
- Qamar-ul Huda, American religious scholar
- Qamar Hussain (born 1948), Indian politician
- Qamar Jalalabadi (1917–2003), Indian poet and lyricist of songs
- Qamar Jalalvi (1887–1968), Pakistani poet, author, and writer
- Qamar Rahman (born 1944), Indian scientist
- Qamar Abbas Rizvi (born 1961), Pakistani politician
- Qamar El Safdy (born 1948), Jordanian actress
- Qamar al-Saltaneh, Iranian royal
- Qamar Siddiqui, Pakistani poet
- Qamar-ol-Moluk Vaziri (1905–1959), Iranian musician
- Qamar Zia (born 1954), Pakistani field hockey player

== Surname ==
- Khalil-ur-Rehman Qamar (born 1962), Pakistani writer, director, and actor
- Maria Qamar (born 1991), Pakistani-Canadian artist and author

== See also ==
- Qamar ud-Din (disambiguation)
- Qamar al-Hasan (disambiguation)
- Qamar al-Islam (disambiguation)
- Qamar al-Zaman (disambiguation)
- Kamar (disambiguation)
- Komar, Iran (disambiguation)
