= Saifuzzaman =

Saifuzzaman (Bengali: সয়ফুজ্জামান, lit. 'Sword of the Era') is a masculine given name and surname of Bengali origin. Notable people with the name include:

== Given name ==
- Saifuzzaman Chowdhury (born 1969), Bangladeshi politician
- Saifuzzaman Chowdhury Jewel, Bangladeshi politician

== Surname ==
- Md. Shifuzzaman (born 1971), Bangladeshi politician

== See also ==
- Nuruzzaman (disambiguation)
- Qamar al-Zaman (disambiguation)
- Shamsuzzaman (disambiguation)
