= Doara =

Town of ancient Cappadocia

Coordinates: 38°12′17″N 34°27′56″E

Doara (Ancient Greek: Δοάρα) was a town of ancient Cappadocia, inhabited in Byzantine times. It was in the Chamanene prefecture created by Archelaus of Cappadocia during Hellenistic times. The town appears on the Peutinger Table between Caesarea and Tavium. It was also mentioned by Hierocles as Rhegedoara (Ῥεγεδοάρα), and the Notitiae Episcopatuum.

Doara became the seat of a Bishopric in 373, as part of the conflict between Anthimus, bishop of Tyana and Basil of Caesarea, as the town lay between these two bishoprics. In 383 the bishop Bosporius was accused of heresy and although originally a suffragan of the bishop in Tyana, in 436 Justinian placed the bishop under the bishop of Mokissos. No longer the seat of a residential bishop, Doara remains a titular see of the Roman Catholic Church.

Although W. M. Ramsay identified Doara with Mudjur (Mucur) or Hacıbektaş (Hadji Bektash), modern scholars located its site near Duvarlı (Divarlı village in Çiftlik town, Niğde) in Asiatic Turkey.
