= Asaduzzaman (disambiguation) =

Asaduzzaman (Bengali: আসদুজ্জামান, lit. 'Lion of the Era') is a Bengali masculine given name of Arabic origin and may refer to:

- Asaduzzaman Khan Hossainpuri (1916–1992), former Jute Minister of Bangladesh
- Khandaker Asaduzzaman (1935–2020), first Finance Secretary of Bangladesh
- Mohammad Asaduzzaman (politician) (1935–1993), Bangladeshi politician from Magura
- Amanullah Asaduzzaman (1942–1969), Bangladeshi student activist
- Asaduzzaman Noor (born 1946), Bangladeshi actor, politician
- Mohammad Asaduzzaman (c. 1948–2008), Bangladeshi educator
- Asaduzzaman Khan (born 1950), Bangladeshi minister of home affairs
- Asaduzzaman Mohammad Raisul Islam (born 1953), Bangladeshi actor
- A. K. M. Asaduzzaman (born 1959), Bangladeshi High Court judge
- Asaduzzaman Mia (born 1960), CEO of National Security Affairs Cell
- Md Asaduzzaman (lawyer) (born 1971), Bangladeshi lawyer and politician from Jhenaidah
- Asaduzzaman Bablu (politician) (born 1984), Bangladeshi politician
- Assaduzzaman Bablu (born 1996), Bangladeshi footballer
- Md Asaduzzaman Asad, Bangladeshi politician from Rajshahi
- Mohammed Asaduzzaman, British-Bangladeshi mayor of Brighton and Hove
- Md. Asaduzzaman (born 1971), Bangladeshi lawyer and politician
- Asaduzzaman Bablu (born 1986), Bangladeshi politician

== See also ==
- Asad
- Zaman
