= Kamar =

Kamar may refer to:

== Places ==
- Kamar, Afghanistan, a village in Khwahan District, Badakhshan Province, Afghanistan
- Kamar, Indonesia, a village on Seram Island, Maluku province, Indonesia
- Kamar, Iran, a village in n Khalkhal County, Ardabil province, Iran
- Kamar, Tajikistan, a village, part of the Sarazm jamoat, Panjakent, Tajikistan

== Other uses ==
- Kamar (deity), daughter of the Georgian god of the sky
- Kamar language, spoken in Madhya Pradesh and Chhattisgarh states, India
- Kamar (name), including a list of people with the given name and surname

== See also ==
- Qamar, a name
