= Zama =

Zama or Zamá may refer to:

== Places ==
- Zama City, Alberta, Canada
- Zama Lake, Alberta, Canada
- Zama, Kanagawa, Japan
  - Camp Zama, a United States Army base in Kanagawa, Japan
- Tulum or Zamá, Mexico
- Zama (Tunisia)
- Zama (Turkey)
- Zama, Mississippi, United States

== Other uses ==
- Battle of Zama, a battle fought in 202 BC between Rome and Carthage
- Zama (novel), a 1956 Argentine novel by Antonio di Benedetto
- Zama (film), a 2017 Argentine period drama film based on di Benedetto's novel and directed by Lucrecia Martel
- Zama Group, a German manufacturer of carburetors

== People with the name ==
- Francis Zama (born 1956), Solomon Islands politician
- Zama Dlamini (born 1991), South African football player
- Zama Habib (born 1971), Indian television writer
- Zama Khanyase, South African politician
