= Morimene =

District in the northwest of ancient Cappadocia

Morimene (Ancient Greek: Μοριμενή) was an ancient district and prefecture (strategia) in the northwestern part of Cappadocia, situated in modern-day Turkey. Located along the banks of the Halys River, the region was historically noted for its significant main city and religious center at Venasa (modern Avanos).

== Geography ==
The district was situated on the flanks of the Halys River (modern Kızılırmak). Ancient geographers characterized Morimene by its lack of arboriculture and its suitability for pastoral activities. Strabo, in his Geography, notes that while the district of Bagadania to the south produced "hardly any fruit-bearing trees," this characteristic was shared by the "greater part of the rest of the country," specifically highlighting Morimene as a region where such trees were absent. Strabo records that Morimene, along with Garsauritis and Lycaonia, was a primary grazing ground for wild donkeys or onagers. Pliny the Elder similarly identifies Morimene as a territory bordering Galatia and notes its reputation for the breeding of wild asses.

While historically a core part of the Cappadocian kingdom, its administrative status shifted during the Roman period. Some Roman sources considered the territory to be part of Galatia. The second-century geographer Ptolemy omits Morimene entirely when enumerating Cappadocia's cities and subregions in his Geography.

== Venasa and the Temple of Zeus ==
The principal settlement of Morimene was Venasa (also spelled Venessa), which is identified with the modern town of Avanos in the Nevşehir Province. The city was home to the Temple of the Venasian Zeus, one of the most important religious institutions in Cappadocia. The sanctuary at Venasa functioned as a "temple state", possessing a large tract of productive sacred land. Strabo recorded that the temple was served by nearly 3,000 temple-servants (hierodouloi). The high priest of the Venasian Zeus held his position for life and was ranked second in authority and prestige within the Cappadocian religious hierarchy, surpassed only by the priest of Comana. The priesthood provided a significant annual revenue, estimated by Strabo at fifteen talents.

== See also ==
- Chamanene – Area in Turkey during the Roman Empire
