= Badi' al-Zaman =

Badi' al-Zaman (Arabic: بديع الزمان, "The Wonder of the Age"), or Bediüzzaman may refer to:

- Badi' al-Zaman al-Hamadani (969–1007), master of Arabic prose
- Badi al-Zaman Hibatallah al-Asturlabi (died 1139), Arab astronomer
- Badi al-Zaman ibn Ismail al-Jazari (1136–1206), Mesopotamian Muslim polymath
- Badi' al-Zaman Mirza (died 1514), Timurid ruler of Herat
- Badi-al Zaman Mirza Safavi (died 1577), Safavid prince
- Mirza Badi-uz-Zaman Safavi (died 1659), Viceroy of Gujarat
- Bediüzzaman Said Nursî (1877–1960), Kurdish theologian
- Badiozzaman Forouzanfar (1904–1970), Iranian linguist and literary scholar
- Muhammad Badiuzzaman Tunu (1929–2020), Bangladeshi freedom fighter
- Mohammed Badi Uzzaman Azmi (1939–2011), British-Pakistani actor
- HM Badiuzzaman Sohag, Bangladeshi politician
- Muhammad Badiuzzaman, former chairman of the Anti-Corruption Commission (Bangladesh)
- Badi oz Zaman, Iranian village

== See also ==
- Zaman
