= Qamar al-Islam =

Qamar ul Islam (Arabic: قمر الإسلام) is an Arabic phrase meaning "Moon of Islam". it may refer to:

== People ==
- Syed Qumrul Islam Saleh Uddin (1937–1983), Bangladeshi politician
- Qamar ul Islam (1948–2017), Indian politician
- Qamrul Islam (born 1950), Bangladeshi government minister and politician
- Qamar-ul-Islam Raja (born 1964), Pakistani politician
- Kamrul Islam Imon (born 1986), Bangladeshi cricketer
- Kazi Kamrul Islam (born 1987), Bangladeshi cricketer
- Kamrul Islam Rabbi (born 1991), Bangladeshi cricketer
- Mohammad Quamrul Islam, Bangladeshi major general and politician
- Kamrul Islam, Bangladeshi doctor and physician

== See also ==
- Qamar (disambiguation)
