= Kamar (name) =

Kamar is a given name and a surname of multiple origins. Notable people with the name include:

== Given name ==
- Kamar Ahmad Simon, Bangladeshi filmmaker
- Kamar Aiken, (born 1989), American professional footballer
- Kamar Baldwin, (born 1997) is an American-born naturalized Georgian professional basketball player
- Kamar Burke (born 1986), Canadian professional basketball player and coach
- Kamar Etyang (born 2002), Kenyan athlete
- Kamar Oshioke (born 1988), Nigerian footballer
- Kamar Samuels, Jamaican-American educator

== Surname ==
- Ahmed Kamar (born 1986), Egyptian sports shooter
- Khaled Kamar (born 1988), Egyptian footballer
- Margaret Kamar (born 1959),Kenyan politician
- Sidek Abdullah Kamar (1936–2005) Malaysian badminton player ad coach

== See also ==
- Qamar
