= Hasanuzzaman (disambiguation) =

Hasanuzzaman (Muhammad Hasanuzzaman; born 1991) is a Bangladeshi cricketer.

Hasanuzzman, meaning "benefactor of the era", may also refer to:

- Muhammad Hasanuzzaman (1900–1968), Bangladeshi politician and educationist
- Hasanuzzaman Khan (1926–2015), Bangladeshi journalist
- Hasanuzzaman Hasan (born 1994), Bangladeshi politician
- Hasanuzzaman Khan Bablu (born 1955), Bangladeshi footballer
- Shah Muhammad Hasanuzzaman (died 2011), Bangladeshi agriculturist

== See also ==
- Hassan (given name)
- Zaman (disambiguation)
