= Zamana =

Zamana or Zamānā (ज़माना, زمانہ "era") may refer to:

== Films ==
- Zamana (1938 film), a 1938 Bollywood Indian film
- Zamana (1985 film), a 1985 Indian film
- Zamana (1993 film), a 1993 Pakistani film
- Zamana (2010 film), a 2010 Indian action drama film
- Zamana (2026 film), a 2026 Indan telugu film

== People with the surname ==
- Cezary Zamana (born 1967), Polish road-racing cyclist
- Volodymyr Zamana (born 1959), Ukrainian general

== Music ==
- Zamana, an album by Karthik Raja
- Naya Zamana, a 2004 album by Lata Mangeshkar
- "Zamana", a song by Carte de Séjour

== See also ==
- Zaman (disambiguation)
- Zamaana Deewana, 1995 Indian film
