= Z-Man =

Z-Man may refer to:

- Z-Man (rapper), rapper from the San Francisco Bay Area
- Z-Man Games, a game company named after Zev Shlasinger
- Z-Man Records, an Australian record label
- Tom Zenk (1958–2017), American professional wrestler
- John Christopher Zander (1966–2025), American political writer
- Fishing gear company

See also:

- Zman (disambiguation)
- Z. Mann Zilla, American rapper and artist
