= Qamar ud-Din =

Qamar ud-Din, or Kamaruddin etc. is a Muslim male or female name or (in modern usage) surname. In Arabic, Qamar ud-Din (قمر الدين) means "Moon of the Faith", and also refers to an apricot-based beverage. It may refer to:

== Men ==
- Shah Sultan Qamar ad-Din ar-Rumi (died 1075), Sufi missionary to Bengal
- Qamar-ud-din Khan Dughlat (died 1392), Mongol ruler of Moghulistan between 1368 and 1392
- Qamar-ud-din Khan, Asaf Jah I (1671–1748), founder of the Asaf Jahi dynasty of Hyderabad
- Itimad-ad-Daula, Qamar-ud-Din Khan (died 1748), former Grand Vizier of the Mughal Empire
- Khwaja Qamar ul Din Sialvi (1906–1981), Pakistani religious leader and politician
- Kamruddin Ahmed (1912–1982), Bangladeshi diplomat, lawyer and politician
- Qamruddin Ahmad Gorakhpuri (1938–2024), Indian Islamic scholar
- Qamaruddin Butt (1914–1974), Pakistani cricketer
- Qamaruddin Bismillah Khan (1916–2006), Indian shehnai player
- Komarudin (1919–1949), Indonesian freedom fighter
- Kaimar-ud-Din bin Maidin (1942–2009), Malaysian athlete
- Raja Petra Kamarudin (1950–2024), British-Malaysian journalist
- Kamarudin Jaffar (born 1951), former Malaysian Minister of Foreign Affairs
- Kamaruddin Jaafar (born 1951), Malaysian politician
- Komaruddin Hidayat (born 1953), Indonesian academic and intellectual
- Kamaruddin Taib (born 1957), Malaysian businessman
- Kamarudeen 'Kamaru' Usman (born 1987), Nigerian-American MMA fighter and former UFC Welterweight Champion
- Haziq Kamaruddin (1993–2021), Malaysian Olympic archer
- Kamarudin Meranun (born 1960), Malaysian businessman
- Kamaruddin Bohan (born 1995), Malaysian footballer
- Komarodin (born 1995), Indonesian footballer
- Kamruddin Ahia Khan Majlish (died 2020), Bangladeshi politician
- Suhaimi Kamaruddin, Malaysian politician
- Kamarudin Md Nor, Malaysian politician
- Kamaruddin Ahmed Dinajpuri, Bangladeshi politician

== Women ==
- Zuraida Kamaruddin (born 1958), Malaysian politician

== Other ==
- Qamar al-Din, a Syrian apricot drink popular during the month of Ramadan

== See also ==
- Qamar (disambiguation)
- Quammruddin Nagar, town in the Indian state of Delhi
