= Özkonak underground city =

Ancient city in Turkey

Coordinates: 38°48′47″N 34°50′22″E

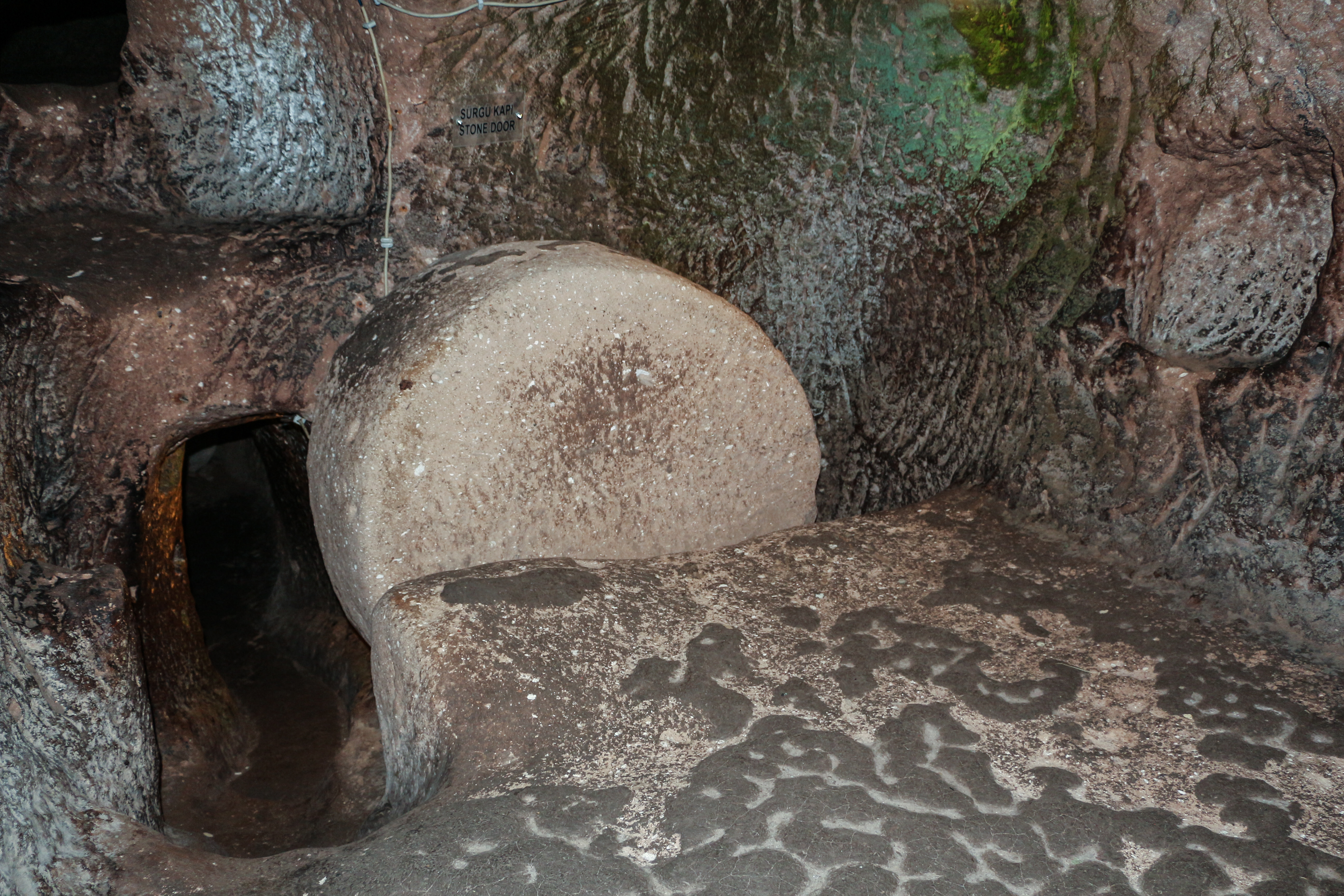
- Stone used as a door in the underground city

- Location within Turkey
- Type: Settlement
- Location: Nevşehir Province, Turkey

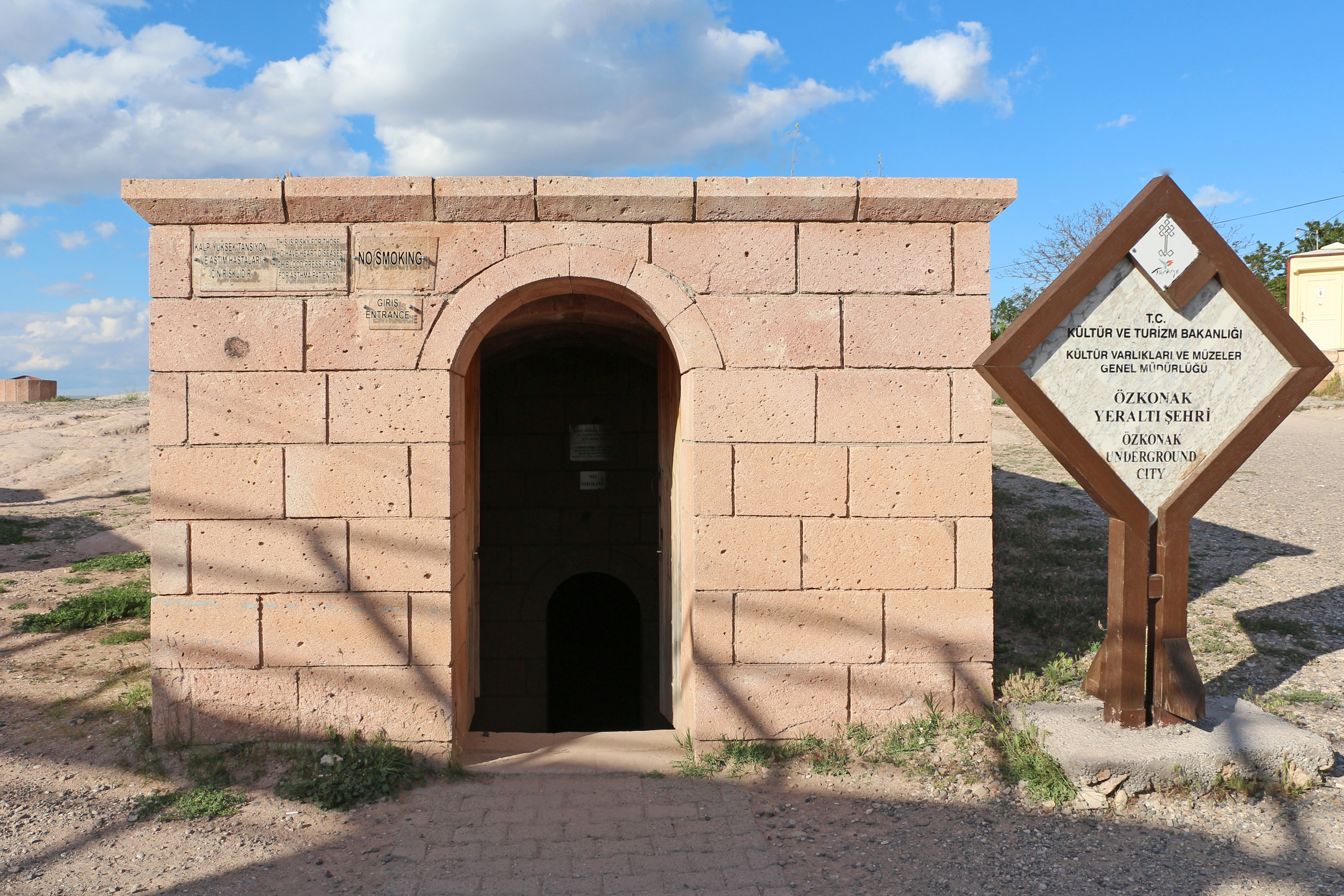
Entrance of the Özkonak Underground City

Özkonak underground city is an ancient city built into the northern slopes of Mt. Idis about 14 km (8.7 mi) northeast of Avanos in Nevşehir Province, in the Central Anatolia region of Turkey.

== Description ==
The city has many strata made up of volcanic granite. Its larger areas are connected to each other by tunnels, and it contains a pipe communication system reaching each of its levels. This feature is unique when compared to the Kaymakli underground city and the Derinkuyu underground city. Each carved room had ventilation provided by further piping when the city was sealed during sieges.

== History ==
The city was probably built by the people of Byzantine Cappadocia, although the age is uncertain and could be older.

The Özkonak Underground City was discovered in 1972 by a local farmer named Latif Acar, who was curious about where his excess crop water was disappearing to. Latif discovered an underground room which, when later excavated, revealed a whole city which could house 60,000 people for up to three months. Although only four floors are now open, the complex contains a total of ten floors, to a depth of 40 m.

Unlike the other underground cities in this area, there were holes above the tunnels used for dumping hot sand on the enemy. Just like Kaymaklı and Derinkuyu, Özkonak has a water well, ventilation system, winery and moving stone doors.

== See also ==
- Cappadocia
- Ihlara Valley
- Underground cities in Avanos
- Cappadocian Greek
- Spiro Kostof
