= Khaliquzzaman =

Khaliquzzaman or Khalequzzaman is a masculine given name and surname of Bangladeshi origin. Notable people with the name include:

== Given name ==
- Khaliquzzaman Elias, Bangladeshi writer

== Surname ==
=== Khalequzzaman ===
- AKM Khalequzzaman, Bangladeshi politician
- Mohammad Khalequzzaman (died 2001), Bangladeshi politician

=== Khaliquzzaman ===
- Chaudhry Khaliquzzaman (1889–1973), Indian-Pakistani politician

== See also ==
- Zaman (disambiguation)
