= Kaymakli underground city =

Archaeological site in South Turkey

Coordinates: 38°27′56″N 34°45′02″E

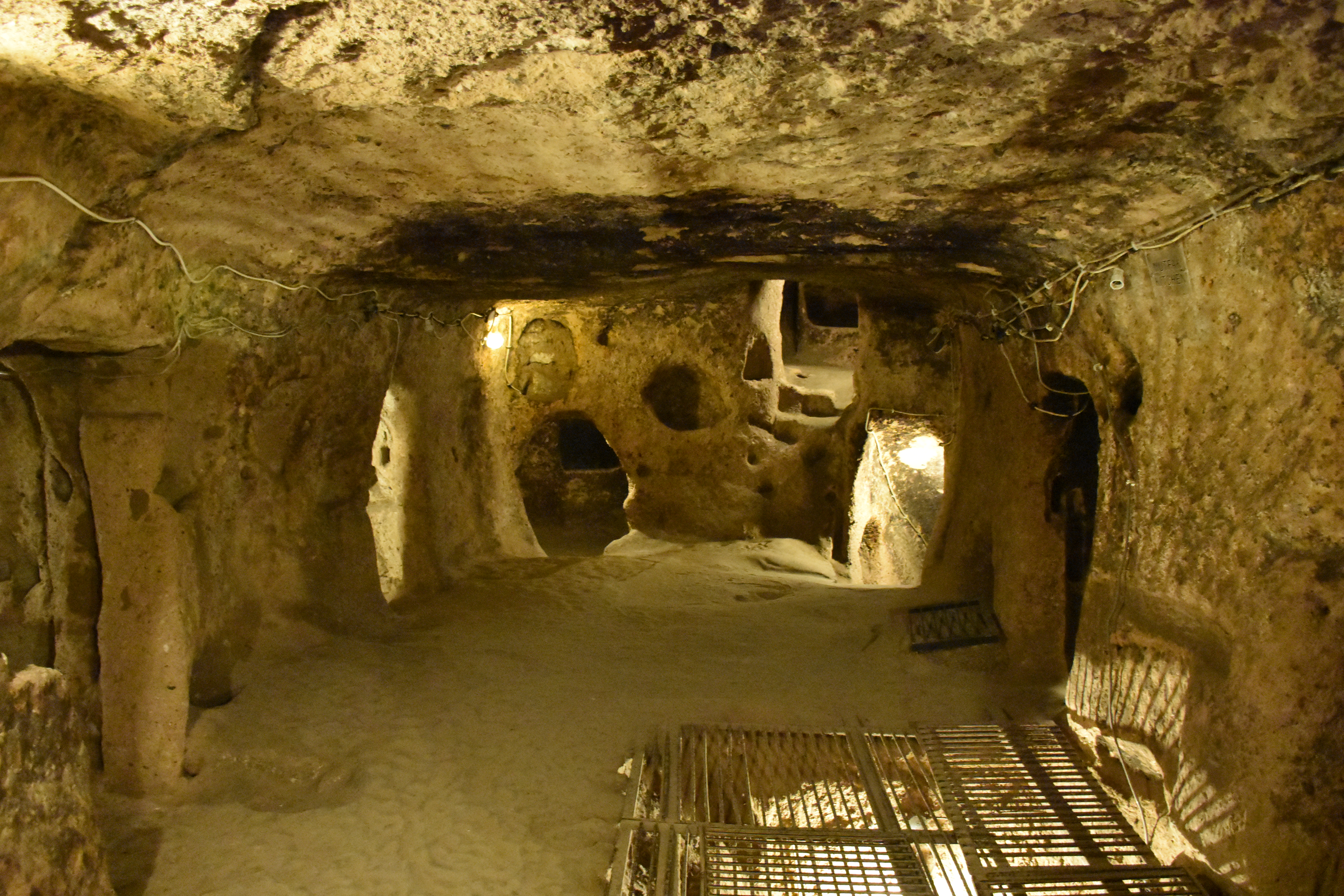
- A large room several floors down into the city

- Location within Turkey
- Type: Settlement
- Location: Nevşehir Province, Turkey

Kaymakli underground city (Turkish: Kaymaklı; Cappadocian Greek: Ανακού) is contained within the citadel of Kaymakli in Nevşehir Province, in the Central Anatolia Region of Turkey. First opened to tourists in 1964, the village is about 19 km from Nevşehir, on the Nevşehir-Niğde road.

== History ==
The ancient name was Enegup. Caves may have first been built in the soft volcanic rock by the Phrygians, an Indo-European people, in the 8th–7th centuries BC, according to the Turkish Department of Culture. After the Greeks colonized the region, the Phrygian language gradually died out in Roman times, replaced with Greek, to which it was related.

The origins of Kaymakli date to the 8th century A.D., when Christians created the underground city to defend themselves from invaders and bandits. The city was greatly expanded and deepened in the Eastern Roman (Byzantine) era, when it was used by the Christian community for protection from Muslim Arab raids during the four centuries of Arab–Byzantine wars (780–1180). The city was connected with the Derinkuyu underground city through 8–9 km (5.0–5.6 mi) of tunnels. Some artifacts discovered in these underground settlements belong to the Middle Byzantine Period, between the 5th and 10th centuries AD. These cities continued to be used by the Christian inhabitants as protection from the Mongolian incursions of Timur in the 14th century.

After the region fell to the Seljuk Turks of Persia, the cities were used as refuges (Greek: καταφύγια, romanized: kataphúgia) from the Turkish Muslim rulers, and as late as the 20th century the inhabitants, now called Rûm ('Eastern Romans') by their Ottoman Turkish rulers, were still using the underground cities to escape periodic waves of Ottoman persecution. Richard MacGillivray Dawkins, a Cambridge linguist who conducted research on the Cappodocian Greeks in the area from 1909–1911, recorded that in 1909,

when the news came of the recent massacres at Adana, a great part of the population at Axo took refuge in these underground chambers, and for some nights did not venture to sleep above ground.

When the Christian (Rûm) inhabitants of the region were expelled in 1923 in the population exchange between Greece and Turkey, the tunnels were abandoned.

== Description ==
The houses in the village are constructed around the nearly one hundred tunnels of the underground city. The tunnels are still used today as storage areas, stables, and cellars. The underground city at Kaymakli differs from Derinkuyu in terms of its structure and layout. The tunnels are lower, narrower, and more steeply inclined. Of the four floors open to tourists, each space is organized around ventilation shafts. This makes the design of each room or open space dependent on the availability of ventilation.

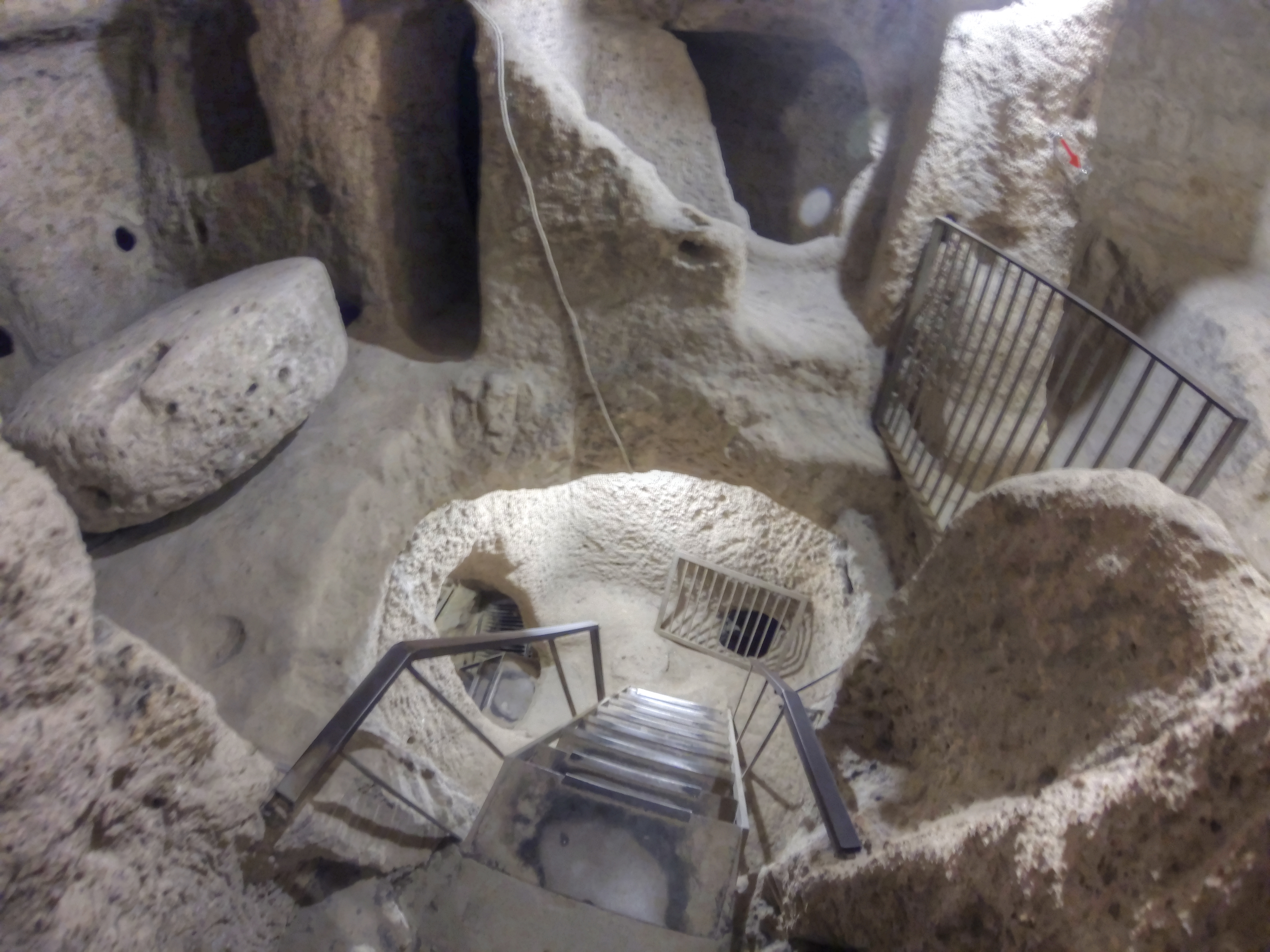
A view showing several floors at once.

A stable is located on the first floor. The small size of the stable could indicate that other stables exist in the sections not yet opened. To the left of the stable is a passage with a millstone door. The door leads into a church. To the right of the stables are rooms, possibly living spaces.

Located on the second floor is a church with a nave and two apses. Located in front of the apses is a baptismal font, and on the sides along the walls are seating platforms. Names of people contained in graves here coincide with those located next to the church, which supports the idea that these graves belonged to religious people. The church level also contains some living spaces.

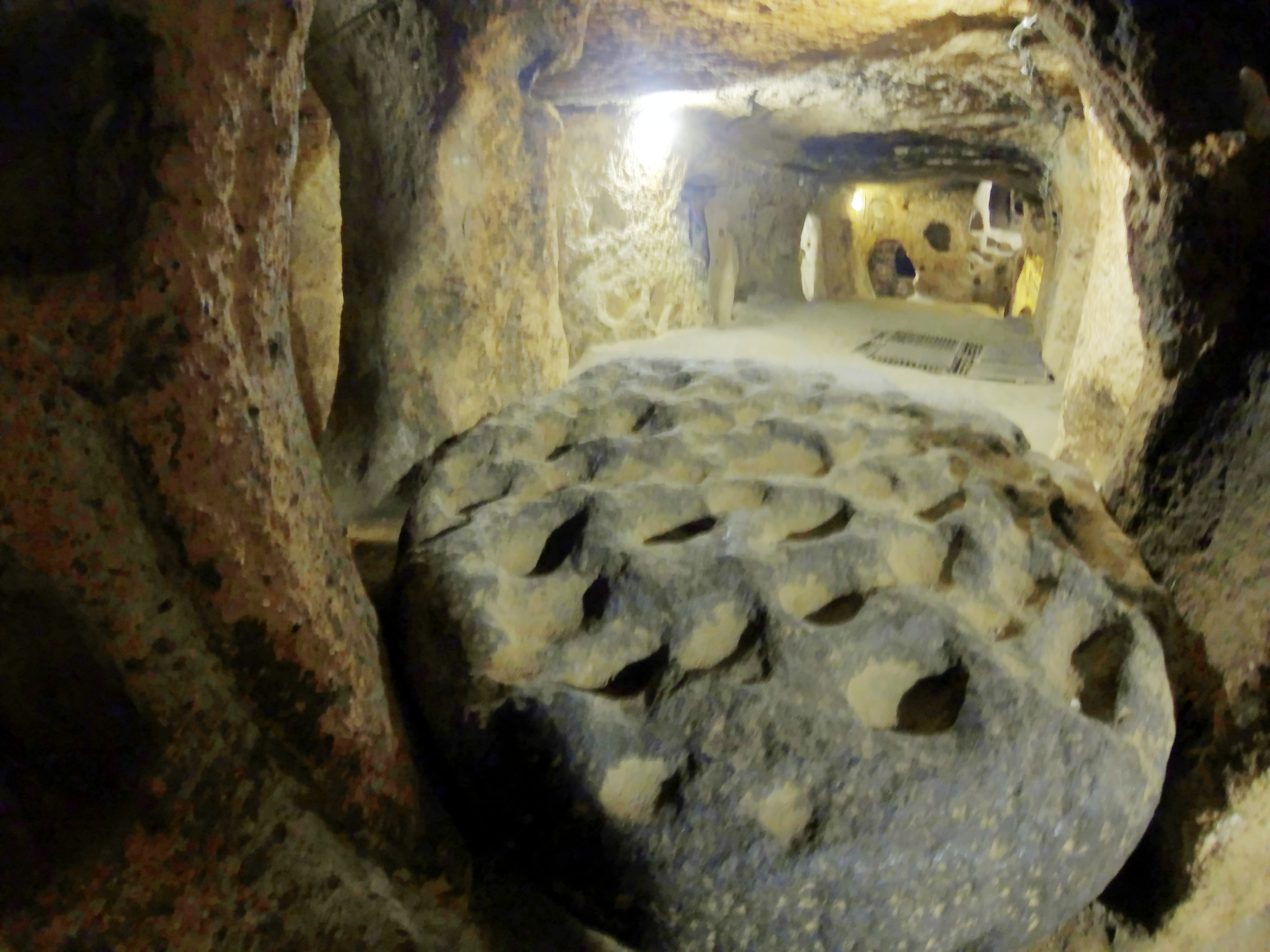
A remarkable block formation of andesite (a volcanic rock) with several holes, used in Kaymakli for cold copper processing.

The third floor contains the most important areas of the underground compound: storage places, wine or oil presses, and kitchens. The level also contains a remarkable block of andesite with relief textures. Recently it was shown that this stone was used for cold-forming copper. The stone was hewn from an andesite layer within the complex. In order for it to be used in metallurgy, fifty-seven holes were carved into the stone.

The technique was to put copper into each of the holes (about 10 centimetres (3.9 in) in diameter) and then to hammer the ore into place. The copper was probably mined between Aksaray and Nevşehir. This mine was also used by Aşıklı Höyük, the oldest settlement within the Cappadocia Region.

The high number of storage rooms and areas for earthenware jars on the fourth floor indicates some economic stability. Kaymakli is one of the largest underground settlements in the region. The large area reserved for storage in such a limited area appears to indicate the need to support a large population underground.

Currently only a fraction of the complex is open to the public.

== See also ==
- Cappadocia
- Özkonak underground city
- Mokissos
- Ihlara Valley
- Underground cities in Avanos
- Cappadocian Greek
- Spiro Kostof
- Population exchange between Greece and Turkey
