= Shahiduzzaman =

Shahiduzzaman is a Bengali masculine given name of Arabic origin and may refer to:

- Shahiduzzaman Sarker (born 1955), former treasurer whip and minister
- Shahiduzzaman Selim (born 1961), theatre, television and film actor
- Shahiduzzaman Beltu, politician
- Mohammad Shahiduzzaman Khokan, politician
- Mohammed Shahiduzzaman Rashidnagari, politician

== See also ==
- Shahid (name)
- Zaman (disambiguation)
- Maulana Shahadatuzzaman Bogra, Islamic scholar and politician
- Shahaduz Zaman, author
- Shahid Zaman, Pakistani squash player
