= Chamanene =

Area in Turkey during the Roman Empire

Chamanene (Ancient Greek: Χαμμανηνή) was an area in central Turkey during the Roman Empire, that adjoined Galatia to the north and west. The area is referred to by Ptolemy, Strabo and Basil of Caesarea. It also appears on Peutinger Table.

The district may have had its origins as a prefecture created by Archeläus of Cappadocia during Hellenistic times and give its name to the modern district of Kaman.

Towns in the district included:

- Parassos
- Therma (Turkey) (or Justinapolis)
- Andrapa
- Galea or Gadia (Turkey)
- Zama (Turkey)
- Doara

== See also ==
- Morimene – District in the northwest of ancient Cappadocia
