= Zman =

Zman is Hebrew for "time", and may refer to:

- A time of day with applications in Jewish law
- A semester in a Yeshiva
- The blessing of Shehechiyanu
- Zman Yisrael, the Hebrew-language sister web site of the Times of Israel

The plural form zmanim may also refer to:

- The third book in Maimonides' Mishneh Torah
- A newspaper run by the Progressive Party in Israel

See also:

- Žman, a village in Croatia
- Z-man (disambiguation)
- Zaman (disambiguation)
