= Eskigümüş Monastery =

Monastery near Niğde, Turkey

Coordinates: 37.9983°N 34.7720°E

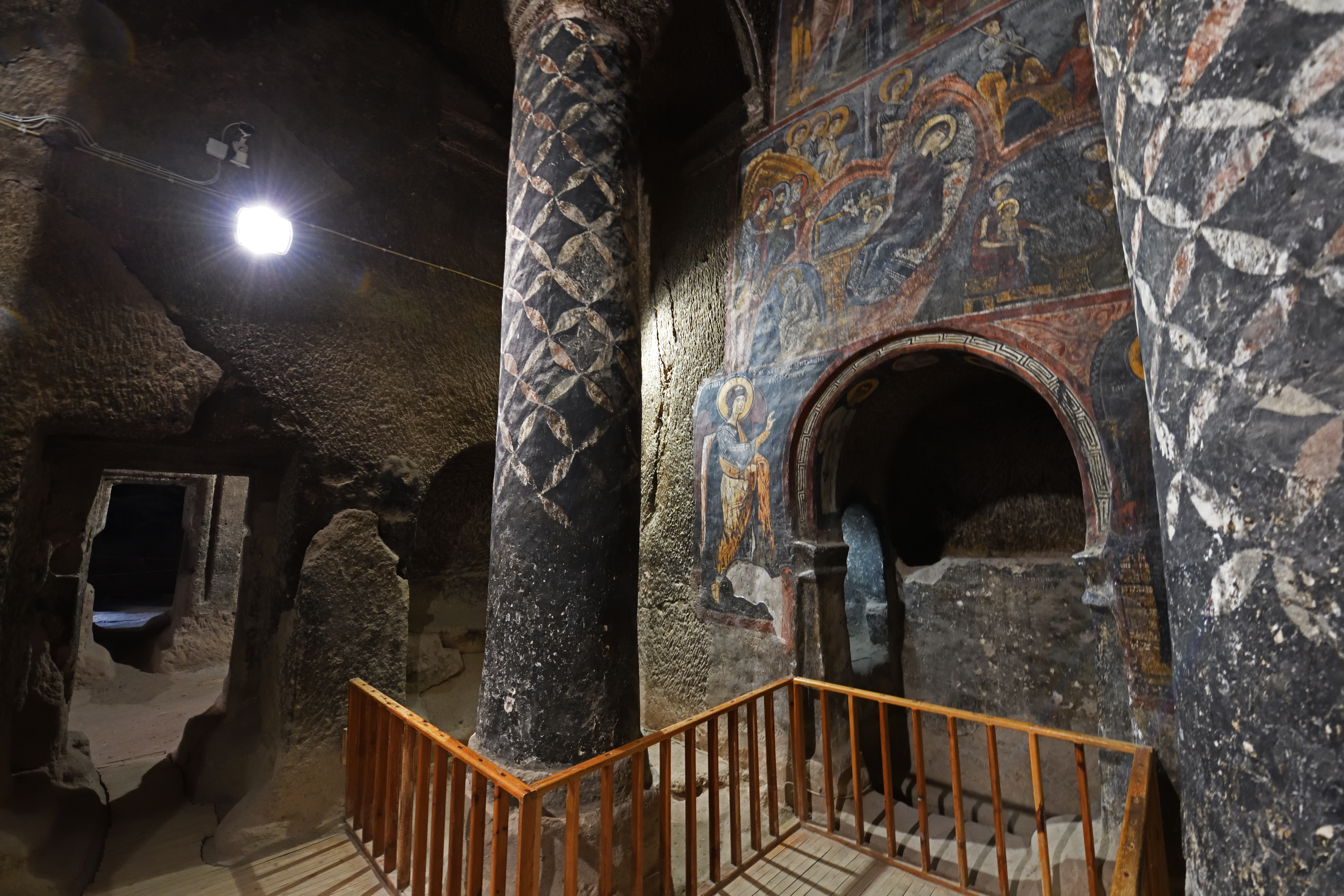
Entrance and North aisle

The Eskigümüş rock cut monastery, located off the Kayseri-Niğde road near to the city of Niğde in Turkey, is famed for having what is believed to be the only fresco with a smiling Theotokos.

As the monastery was only recently rediscovered by western Europeans, it was not subjected to the vandalism common among many of the churches and monasteries in Cappadoccia.

The monastery is the furthest south of all of the Cappadocian monasteries. It is located close to the route used by invading Arabs in the 7th century, who traversed the Tarsus Mountains from the south to plunder Kayseri. This route follows the Tarsus River through the rugged Gülek Pass which, known in ancient times as the Cilician Gates, was used by Alexander the Great during his eastward campaign into Persia.

The plain entrance to the Monastery was designed to shield the complex from passing invaders. This camouflage was so successful that the monastery remained unknown until 1963. High walls surround the large inner courtyard walls with monastic rooms and storage areas. The main church is large and is in extremely good condition, with the many well-preserved frescoes considered to be among the greatest examples of Byzantine art in the region.

== See also ==
- Cappadocia;
  - Underground cities in Avanos
  - Kaymaklı Underground City
  - Ihlara Valley
  - Cappadocian Greek
- Other monasteries;
  - Sümela Monastery
  - Kaymaklı Monastery
  - Monasteries of Mardin
- Last House of the Virgin Mary
- Ancient cities;
  - Ephesus
  - Demre
