= Qamar al-Hasan =

Qamrul Hasan (Bengali: কমরুল হাসন, lit. 'Moon of al-Hasan') is a Bengali masculine given name of Arabic origin. It may refer to:

== People ==
- Quamrul Hassan Potua (1921–1988), Bangladeshi artist
- Qamrul Hassan Bhuiyan (1952–2018), Bangladeshi major general
- Kamrul Hasan Khan (born 1955), 7th Vice Chancellor of Bangabandhu Sheikh Mujib Medical University

== See also ==
- Qamar (disambiguation)
