= Zama (Turkey) =

- locality
- Location in Turkey
- Coordinates: 39°45′15″N 34°49′30″E
- Country: Turkey
- Province: Yozgat

Zama was a Roman and Byzantine era town in the Roman district of Chamanene, in what is today central Turkey. It has been tentatively identified with ruins on the Halys River between Caesarea in Cappadocia and Tavium. Halys River.
