= Badiuzzaman Tunu =

Bangladeshi freedom fighter (c.1929–2020)

Md. Badiuzzaman Tunu
- মো. বদিউজ্জামান টুনু
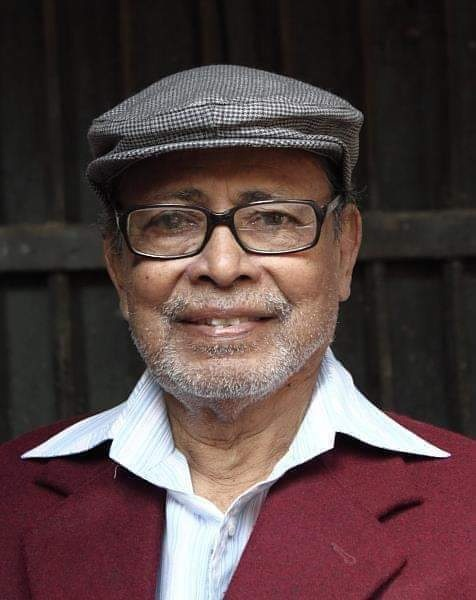

Personal details
- Born: c. 1929; Rajshahi District
- Died: 21 June 2020 (aged 91); Rajshahi Medical College Hospital
- Spouse: Feroza Zaman
- Children: 2 sons and 3 daughters
- Parent(s): Abdul Gafur, Tairunnessa
- Awards: Bir Pratik

Md. Badiuzzaman Tunu (c. 1929 – 21 June 2020) was a freedom fighter with the title of Bir Pratik (the fourth highest gallantry award in Bangladesh) of Rajshahi District of Bangladesh.

== Birth and early life ==
Md. Badiuzzaman Tunu was born in 1929 at his ancestral home at Laxmipur Jhautala in Rajshahi. His wife was Feroza Zaman (Ex Member of Parliament). He has 2 sons and 3 daughters. One son is a Canada expatriate. One daughter is an expatriate in Australia. 2 daughters live in Dhaka. One son lives in house at Laxmipur Jhautala in Rajshahi.

== Career and role in liberation war ==
Badiuzzaman Tunu was working in a pharmaceutical company in 1971. He showed his bravery in guerrilla warfare and frontal warfare in different areas of Sector 7 with the training of war in India during the war of liberation. He was awarded the title of Bir Protik for his courage and bravery in the war of liberation. On March 25, 1971, the Pakistani army killed his elder brother's two sons, younger brother, brother-in-law and niece-in-law Nazmul Haque.

== Death ==
Tunu died on 21 June 2020.
