= Qamar Zaman Khan =

Pakistani politician

Sardar Qamar Zaman Khan
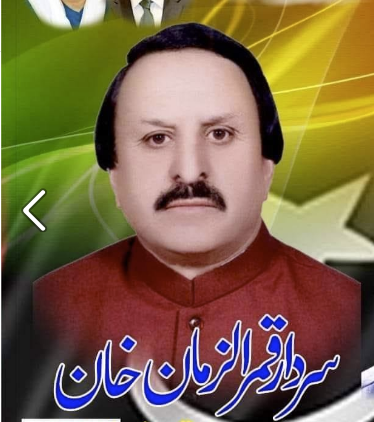

Health minister of Azad Kashmir

Personal details
- Born: 19 August 1952 (age 73) Bagh, Azad Kashmir, Pakistan
- Party: Pakistan Peoples Party

Sardar Qamar Zaman Khan (Urdu: سردار قمر زمان خان; born 19 August 1952) is a Pakistani politician who served as Senior Minister, Education Minister, Leader of Opposition, Health Minister and Acting Prime Minister of Azad Kashmir.

== Early life and education ==
Sardar Qamar Zaman Khan was born on 19 August 1952, in village Panyali Tehsil and District Bagh, Azad Kashmir. He belong to a reputed Maldiyal tribe of Poonch. He obtained his initial education from Panyali. He passed matriculation examination from Govt. High School Bagh, Azad Kashmir and later on passed FSc and B.A from Govt. Degree College Muzaffarabad. During this period the pillars of the Govt. has been trembling due to his rightessness and his outspoken activities. He vigorously and tirelessly struggled for the rights of students and he played a vital role in this regard. He launched a struggle for the rights of the students in 1978, against the MARSHALLA regime and due to his tireless efforts he was placed in detention, where he was badly tortured. He earned a great repute due to his rightessness and he always represents and supports the poor faction of society.

== Political career ==
In 1990, he was elected as an independent candidate from LA-XIV Bagh II and assumed the charge of Minister Education as an ally of PPP Govt.

In 1991, again he was elected as an independent candidate from constituency LA-XV Bagh III. Later on in December 1992, he was placed into detention for the sake of rights of the people and remains in detention for two months (approximately). He performed his duties as vice-president of Pakistan Peoples Party Azad Kashmir, and Chairman Social Action Programme in 1993.

In 1996, he has been again elected on the ticket of Pakistan Peoples Party and assumed the charge of Minister Education and Minister Finance later.

On 27 November 2002, AJK Ehtesab Bureau arrested him over charges of corruptionbut was not proven guilty in court .

In 2006, once again he was elected in the General Elections and he has been elected as Leader of the Opposition in Azad Kashmir Assembly and later on Minister Health / Senior Minister and also performed the function as Acting Prime Minister.

As a Minister of Education he introduced "Education Package" for Azad Jammu and Kashmir for which number of schools and colleges has been established, upgraded and thousands of number of Jobs created for Jobless people. And similarly as Minister Health he also delivered "Health Package" for the poorest of the poor people of Azad Jmmu and Kahsmir and earned a great repute due to his outstanding performance.

He was a member of Azad Kashmir assembly (MLA), he is also performing functions of Vice-President of PPP AJK, and also working as Acting Member of Election Campaign for the Party, and Member of une Board of PPP AJK.

== Notable works ==
Under his competent leadership, the women’s university bagh was established he had done good work in health and education with 17 BHUs and RHCs. He established institution of Bagh development authority and Corporation. He is called as sir syed of Bagh Azad Kashmir. He is real leader ever District Bagh ever had after independence of this state of Azad Kashmir.
