= Zaman-e Sofla =

Zaman-e Sofla زمان سفلي
- Village
- Location within Iran
- Coordinates: 30°31′13″N 55°07′23″E
- Country: Iran
- Province: Kerman
- County: Shahr-e Babak
- Bakhsh: Dehaj
- Rural District: Jowzam

Population (2006)
  - Total: 48
- Time zone: UTC+3:30 (IRST)
  - Summer (DST): UTC+4:30 (IRDT)

Zaman-e Sofla (Persian: زمان سفلي, also Romanized as Zamān-e Soflá; also known as Zamān) is a village in Jowzam Rural District, Dehaj District, Shahr-e Babak County, Kerman Province, Iran. At the 2006 census, its population was 48, in 15 families. One of the members of the family is the infamous .
