= Kamar Oshioke =

Nigerian association football player

Personal information
- Full name: Kamar Kayode Oshioke
- Date of birth: May 30, 1988 (age 38)
- Place of birth: Ibadan, Nigeria
- Height: 1.91 m (6 ft 3 in)
- Position: Striker

Team information
- Current team: Jalisco FC
- Number: 5

Senior career*
Years	Team	Apps	(Gls)
2009–2011	Shooting Stars		
2012–2013	Ballenas Galeana		
2015	Sonora	10	(3)
2016–2017	Deportivo Carchá	5	(0)
- * Club domestic league appearances and goals as of 14 September 2015

Kamar Kayode Oshioke (born May 30, 1988 in Ibadan, Nigeria) is a Nigerian footballer.

== Career ==
Oshioke starter his career with Nigerian team Shooting Stars SC after having played Baseball professionally.

He then was given the opportunity to train with Spanish team, Real Oviedo.

=== Mexico ===
On 2011 Oshioke trained in the pre-season with Mexican team, Leones Negros UdeG, but he did not stayed because of his Spanish. That same year, Ballenas Galeana, a third division team, registered the Nigerian for the season.

In 2015 Cimarrones de Sonora was registered the player for the Ascenso MX 2015–16 season. He made his official debut on July 25, 2015 in the first game of the season, the game ended up 1-0 to Alebrijes de Oaxaca in the Estadio Benito Juárez. Oshioke scored his first two goals with Cimarrones in an away 0-4 game against Cafetaleros de Tapachula.

He currently plays amateur soccer in the Liga Premier Valles for the team Jalisco FC, with whom he earned promotion to Group 1 of this division and won the championship following a grueling tournament, during which he scored 28 goals.
