= Qamar Dagar =

Indian calligrapher

- Born: New Delhi
- Occupation: Calligrapher

Qamar Dagar is an Indian calligrapher. She is the founder of the Qalamkaari Creative Calligraphy Trust. In 2016, she was awarded the Nari Shakti Puraskar, India's highest civilian award for women.

== Early life and education ==
Dagar was born in New Delhi to a family of classical Dhrupad musicians. She graduated from the University of Delhi with a degree in sociology. She has cited calligraphers Hassan Massoudy and Mohammad Elbaz as mentors.

== Career ==
Dagar is a professional calligrapher who uses an abstract pictorial calligraphy style in her work. CNBC TV18 called her India's "most celebrated pictorial calligrapher."

Dagar's solo exhibitions have taken place in India, France and the United States. In 2019, she participated in a group exhibit at the Indira Gandhi National Centre for the Arts.

In addition to her own professional use of calligraphy, she works to preserve the art form in India through her organization, the Qalamkaari Creative Calligraphy Trust. She founded the Trust to organize events for artists to share their work with the public and to keep the art of calligraphy alive. Dagar has organized international calligraphy festivals. Her calligraphy workshops have earned media attention as a cultural attraction for tourists to India. She has also spread knowledge with children about Calligraphy during interactive sessions with the celebrity show host Mrs. NIDHI KUMAR conducted by Skoolz.

== Awards and honours ==
In 2016, President Pranab Mukherjee awarded her the Nari Shakti Puraskar, the highest civil award in India for women.
