= Qamar al-Zaman =

Qamar Al Zaman (Arabic: قمر الزمان) is an Arabic phrase meaning "Moon of the era". it may refer to:

== People ==
- Kamarulzaman Teh (1920–2002), Malaysian socialist
- Kamaruzaman Sjam (1924–1986), Indonesian communist
- Abul Hasnat Muhammad Qamaruzzaman (1926–1975), Bangladeshi government minister
- Qamar-uz-Zaman Shah (1933–2016), Pakistani agriculturalist and politician
- Qamar-ul-Zaman Faridi Chishti (1940–2011), Pakistani Sufi saint
- Kamaruzzaman Shariff (born 1941), fifth Mayor of Kuala Lumpur
- Qamaruzzaman Azmi (born 1946), Indian Islamic scholar
- Muhammad Kamaruzzaman (1952–2015), Bangladeshi journalist and politician
- Qamar Zaman (born 1952), Pakistani squash player
- Qamar Zaman Khan (born 1952), Pakistani minister
- Qamar Zaman Kaira (born 1960), Pakistani government minister
- Qamar Zaman Chaudhry (born 1960), Pakistani bureaucrat
- Kamaruzaman Mohamad (born 1961), Malaysian journalist and editor
- Kamarulzaman Mat Salleh (born 1964), fourteenth Mayor of Kuala Lumpur
- Kamarulzaman Hassan (born 1979), Malaysian footballer
- Md. Kamruzzaman (fl. 1986–1988), Bangladeshi politician
- AKM Kamruzzaman (fl. 1991–1996), Bangladeshi politician
- Qamar-uz-Zaman Chaudhry, Pakistani climate scientist
- Kazi Kamruzzaman, Bangladeshi paediatric surgeon and social worker

== Other ==
- CGS Kamaruzzaman, a leader-class offshore patrol vessel of the Bangladesh Coast Guard
- Shaheed Qamaruzzaman Stadium, a multi-use stadium in Rajshahi, Bangladesh
- Kamaralzaman or Camaralzaman, a fictional character in the book One Thousand and One Nights

== See also ==
- Shamsuzzaman (disambiguation)
- Qamar (disambiguation)
