= Shamsuzzaman =

Shamsuzzaman (Bengali: শমসুজ্জামান, lit. 'Sun of the Era') is a masculine given name of Bengali origin. Notable people with the name include:

== Given name ==
- Shamsuzzaman (guerrilla) (died 1971), Bangladeshi guerrilla fighter
- Shamsuzzaman Dudu, Bangladeshi politician
- Shamsuzzaman Khan (1940–2021), Bangladeshi academic and folklorist

== See also ==
- Qamaruzzaman
