= Shamsuzzaman (guerrilla) =

Soldier in Bangladeshi war of independence and recipient of Bir Uttom

Shahid Shamsuzzaman Bir Uttom
- শামসুজ্জামান
- Born: Sonarchar, Tipperah district, East Bengal
- Died: 1971
- Occupation: Student
- Known for: Bir Uttom

Shahid Shamsuzzaman (Bengali: শামসুজ্জামান; died 1971) was a Bengali fighter for the Mukti Bahini who was killed during the Bangladesh Liberation War. He was posthumously awarded with a Bir Uttom by the Government of Bangladesh.

== Early life and family ==
Shamsuzzaman was born into a Sunni Bengali family in the village of Shonar Char in Meghna, Tipperah district, East Bengal, which was then a part of Pakistan (now Bangladesh). He was among the two sons and three daughters of Muhammad Dawlat Husayn and Begum Ayetunnesa. Out of his siblings, only his sister Begum Momtaz was still alive as of 2011.

== Liberation War and death ==
Shamsuzzaman enrolled at the University of Dacca to study soil science. The Bangladesh Liberation War began whilst he was in his third year of studies, and so he left to join the Mukti Bahini. He completed his training within 28 days and was then employed to the Eighth East Bengal Regiment supervised by the Z-Force. On 4 August, two companies of fighters moved from the Assembly Area of Nakshi BOP (in Jhenaigati, Sherpur, under Sector No. 11) late at night and entered the FUP area. There were 25 soldiers in total but the rest of them were all quickly trained civilians. The two companies were divided into several platoons, and Shamsuzzaman was a member of one of them. They fought the Pakistan Army in the border area. They all quietly stationed themselves at the fire base. Amin Ahmed Chowdhury (Bir Bikram) signalled an attack. At the same time, the Mukti Bahini continued to move towards the goal and the artillery fire began on both sides. The undertrained Mukti Bahini, including Shamsuzzaman joined the soldiers, approached the Pakistani army position. At that time, a Pakistani artillery shell fell on them. Several Mukti Bahini were killed by the shelling, with the bodies of two or three were dismembered and others dispersed. Shamsuzzaman continued to advance on the battlefield, reaching 50 yards of the BOP before he was suddenly killed by a landmine.
