= Mohammed Asaduzzaman =

Former mayor of Brighton and Hove

Mayor of Brighton and Hove
- In office 16 May 2024 – 22 May 2025
- Preceded by: Jackie O’Quinn
- Succeeded by: Amanda Grimshaw

Personal details
- Born: Bangladesh
- Party: Labour
- Education: University of Dhaka

Mohammed Asaduzzaman is a British politician who became the first Bangladeshi Muslim mayor of Brighton and Hove, a city in the United Kingdom. He was elected to the Brighton & Hove City Council in the Hollingdean and Fiveways ward in May 2023. On 22 May 2025, the City Council elected Amanda Grimshaw as his successor.

== Early life and education ==
Asaduzzaman was born in Bangladesh.

== Life ==
In 2024, Asaduzzaman was appointed as Deputy Mayor and took the mayoralty on May 17.

His official portrait was unveiled at the end of his term of office.
