= Qamar El Safdy =

Jordanian actress

- قمر الصفدي
- Born: 1948 (age 77–78); Jordan
- Occupations: Actress, voice actress
- Years active: 1964–present

Qamar El Safdy (Arabic: قمر الصفدي; born 1948) is a Jordanian actress and voice actress.

== Biography ==
Qamar El Safdy was born in 1948. Safdy began her voice acting career in 1964 while she was attending secondary school. She featured on over 300 radio dramas including Qamar and Stars and over 100 television series including Bab Al-Amoud Hotel, the first television series filmed in Jordan. She also dubbed various documentaries.

At some point, Safdy was named as the dean of Jordanian actresses. In 2008, Safdy was awarded the Jordanian State Appreciation Award for acting. In 2018, Safdy was named "Artist of the Year". On 25 May 2019 (Independence Day), Jordanian king Abdullah II awarded Safdy the Ibn Al-Hussein Medal of Excellence second class to recognize her contributions to Jordanian cinema.

== Select filmography ==
The following is a list of some notable films and television series that Safdy starred in.

- Bab Al-Amoud Hotel (1969)
- A Maid from Nishapur (1971)
- Harun al-Rashid (1977)
- Al-Zahir Baybars (1979)
- Suqur La Talhath (1985)
- Hearts and Children (1991)
- Al Saby wal Malek (1992)
- The Long Night (1996)
- Masror in Pearl Island (1998)
- Qamar and Stars (1998)
- Sultana (2007)
- Mokhawi Al Deeb (2009)
- Tozher Al Ashwak (2010)
- Daw Aswad (2017)
- Talal Street (2023)

== See also ==
- Cinema of Jordan
