= Francis Zama =

Solomon Islands politician (born 1956)

Francis Zama (born 3 July 1956) is a Solomon Islands politician. He is a member of the National Parliament of the Solomon Islands, and was elected to Parliament representing Tetepare on Rendova Island, South New Georgia on 5 December 2001 and was re-elected on 5 April 2006. He was Minister of Finance of the Solomon Islands from 2003 to 2005 and in 2007.
