= Nuruzzaman =

Nuruzzaman (Bengali: নূরুজ্জামান, lit. 'Light of the Era') is a masculine given name and surname of Bengali origin. Notable people with the name include:

== Given name ==
- Nuruzzaman (cricketer) (born 1994), Bangladeshi cricketer
- Nuruzzaman Ahmed (born 1950), Bangladeshi politician
- Nuruzzaman Biswas (born 1948), Bangladeshi politician
- Nuruzzaman Masum (born 1990), Bangladeshi cricketer
- Nuruzzaman Nayan (born 1980), Bangladeshi footballer

== Surname ==
- A. N. M. Nuruzzaman (1938–1993), Bangladeshi Army officer
- Dr. M. Nuruzzaman (born 1961), Indian doctor and politician
- Kazi Nuruzzaman (1925–2011), Bangladeshi war hero
- Kazi Nuruzzaman (politician) (died 2017), Bangladeshi politician
- Md. Nuruzzaman (born 1956), Bangladeshi judge
- Mohammad Nuruzzaman (born 1974), Bangladeshi cricketer
- Mohammad Nuruzzaman (Kishoreganj politician), Bangladeshi politician
- SM Nuruzzaman, Bangladeshi politician

== See also ==
- Nur (name)
- Zaman (disambiguation)
- Nor Zamani Abdol Hamid, Malaysian civil servant and educator
- Noor Zaman, Pakistani squash player
