= Zelve Monastery =

Byzantine-era monastery in Turkey

Coordinates: 38°40′N 34°50′E

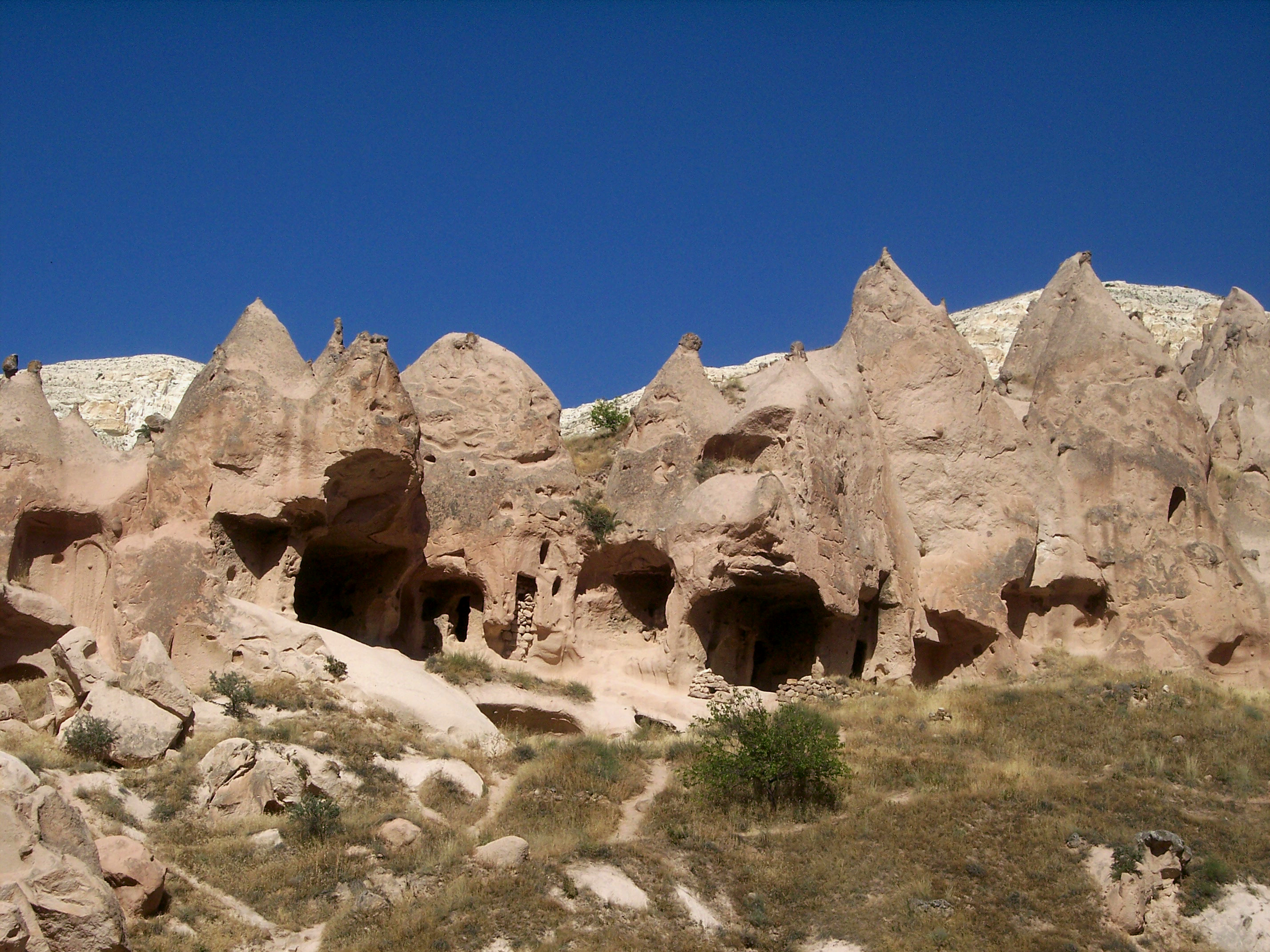
Rock dwelling in a fairy chimney at Zelve

The Zelve Monastery is a Byzantine-era monastery that was carved into the rock in pre-iconoclastic times. It is part of the Zelve Open Air Museum, located between Ürgüp and Avanos, Turkey.

== Remains ==
The remains of the Zelve monastery complex are located on the northern slopes of Aktepe, 1 km from Paşa Bağlari and 10 km from Göreme on the Avanos road. Zelve does not have the rich frescoes of Göreme and other Cappadocian locations. Zelve is spread out over three valleys, of which two are connected by a tunnel. The complex contains innumerable rooms and passages which also house many pointed fairy chimneys with large stems, at about 40 feet above the valley floor.

The valley was a monastic retreat between the 9th and 13th centuries. The site was inhabited until 1952 when villagers were relocated to nearby Aktepe due to safety concerns.

Cappadocia's first seminaries to train priests are located here at the monastery. Dating back to the early years of monastery life in Zelve is the Direkli Church (with the famed columns). Direkli is located at the bottom of the slope. The main decorations are iconoclastic-doctrine high relief crosses. The valley also contains the Balikli Kilise (Fish church), Üzümlü Kilise (Grapes church) and the now totally collapsed Geyikli Kilise (Deer church). These churches date to the pre-iconoclastic period.

The area was inhabited until 1952, when the last inhabitants moved to the new town Yeni Zelve ("New Zelve"), 2 km away. In 1967, Zelve was turned into an open-air museum.

The area also contains houses, a tunnel joining two of the valleys, a mill (without sails), and a small mosque. Several dovecotes are found in the valley.
