= Avanos =

- Municipality
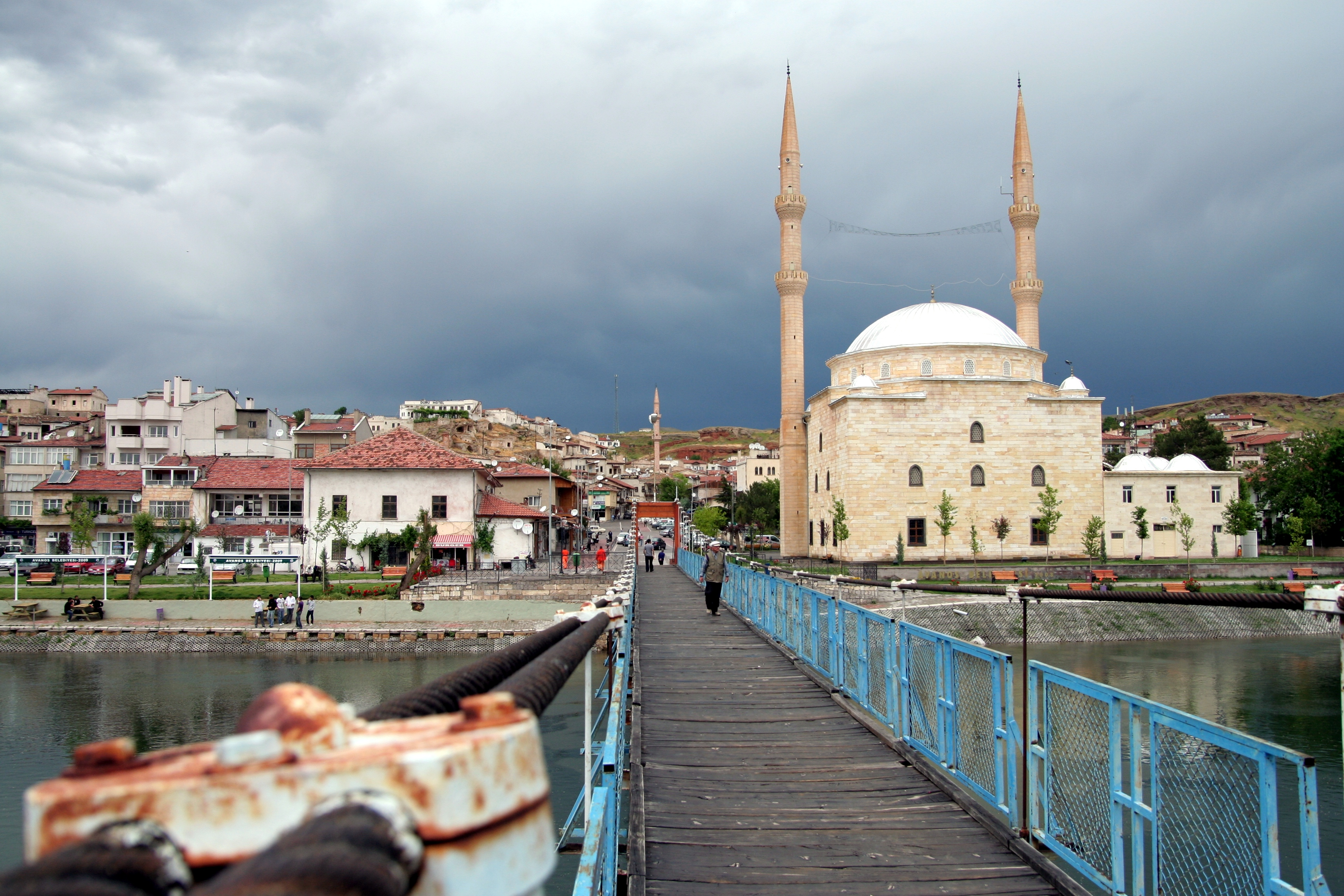
- Avanos town centre

- Logo

- Location within Turkey Location within Turkey Central Anatolia
- Coordinates: 38°42′54″N 34°50′48″E
- Country: Turkey
- Province: Nevşehir
- District: Avanos

Government
  - Mayor: Mustafa Kenan Sarıtaş (MHP)
- Elevation: 920 m (3,020 ft)
- Population (2022): 14,968
- Time zone: UTC+3 (TRT)
- Postal code: 50500
- Area code: 0384
- Climate: Csb
- Website: www.avanos.bel.tr

Avanos is a town in Nevşehir Province in the Cappadocia region of Central Anatolia, Turkey, located 18 km (11 mi) north of Nevşehir, the capital city of the province. It is the seat of Avanos District. Its population is 14,968 (2022). Historically known as Venessa, modern Avanos stands on the banks of the longest river of Turkey, the Kızılırmak (Red River), the ancient Halys.

Avanos' most important industry is pottery production, an industry which probably dates back to Hittite times and which makes use of clay from the red silt of the Kızılırmak. The town is also a popular tourist destination because of its attractive old town and riverside location.

Like the rest of Cappadocia, Avanos has a continental climate with very hot, dry summers, and cold, snowy winters.

== History ==
Old Avanos is riddled with a network of small underground "cities" which may have once been residential but are now mainly used by the many pottery enterprises. Although there is no documented evidence to prove when these structures were carved out of the earth, it is probable that work on some of them began in the Hittite period.

As Venessa, ancient Avanos was the third most important town in the Kingdom of Cappadocia (332 BC – 17 AD) according to the geographer Strabo. Although it was the site of an important temple of Zeus, nothing remains of it today. In Roman and Byzantine times, Avanos had a large Christian population who were responsible for the rock-cut Dereyamanlı Kilisesi. Unusually, this is still occasionally used even today.

From 1867 until 1922, Avanos was part of Angora vilayet of the Ottoman Empire. Most of the visible remains of Avanos' history date from the 19th and early 20th centuries and take the form of many impressive stone houses, mostly built by the now-displaced Greek and Armenian populations. These houses are found in the older part of the city on the northern bank of the river. Avanos expanded rapidly in the early 2000s and there is now a lot of modern housing on the southern side of the river which was extensively landscaped and developed for recreational purposes in the years after 2010.

== Attractions around Avanos ==
=== Çalış ===
- In 2019 unexpected flooding in the small settlement of Çalış, north of Avanos town, led to the discovery of an approximately 5,000-year-old three-story underground town referred to as “Gir-Gör” (Enter and See) by locals. The five-kilometre-long "city" contained homes, tunnels, and places of worship. A small human figurine was discovered inside the site. According to the locals, the site was considered a source of healing water and was called “Caesar’s bath". It is not currently open to the public.
- Zelve

About 5 km (3 mi) from Avanos and 1 km (1 mi) from Paşabağ, the site of Zelve was developed across three valleys on the steep northern slopes of Aktepe. It is not known exactly when people began living in the rock-cut dwellings in a troglodytic lifestyle common to other places in the region such as Uçhisar, Göreme and Cavuşin. An important Christian community lived in Zelve which was the religious centre for the area from the 9th to the 13th centuries. The first religious seminars for priests were held in the vicinity.

- Paşabağ and Devrent

At Paşabağ there are a large number of distinctive fairy chimneys with particularly sharp points and thick trunks. There is even a police station inside one of them. Devrent is known for rock formations into which people read carvings such as a camel.

- Çavuşin

The impressively frescoed Church of St John the Baptist (also known as the Nicephorus Phocas Church or the Great Pigeon House) stands beside the Avanos-Göreme road on the edge of the village of Çavuşin. It dates back to 964-965 AD. A second church, also called St John the Baptist, is harder to find inside the old part of the village.

- Güllüdere

Dating back to the 6th or 7th century, the church of St. Agathangelus is located on the far left side of the Güllüdere valley about 2 km (1 mi) from the village of Çavuşin. The nave is square and ends in a single broad apse added to the main structure in the 9th or 10th century. The two or three layers of frescoes in the apse indicate that it was repainted regularly. Symbols of the Gospel writers are placed on the right and left of an enthroned Jesus. In the middle of the flat ceiling a relief cross is shown in the middle of a circle surrounded with palm leaves and garlands. It probably dates back to the Iconoclastic period.

- Özkonak Underground City

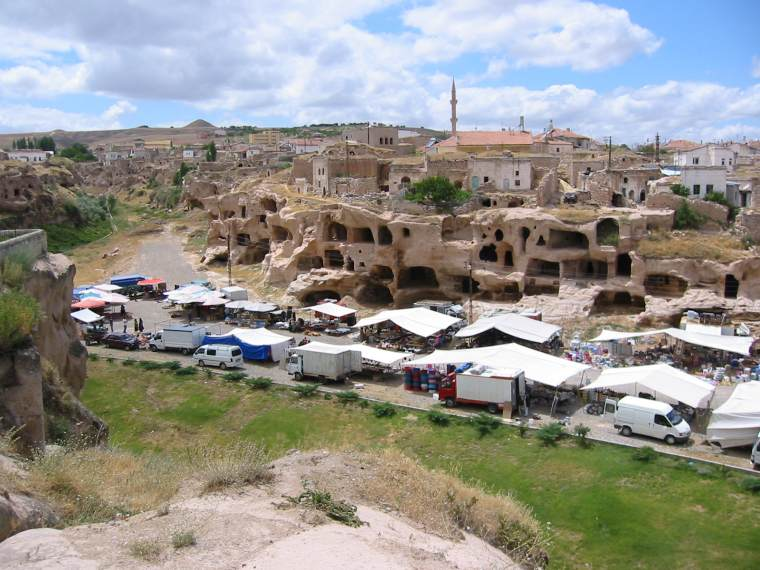
Özkonak town

Located 14 km (9 mi) northeast of Avanos, this underground city was carved out of the northern slopes of Mt. Idis in an area with many volcanic granite strata. Its extensive galleries are spread out over a large area and connected to one another by tunnels. The city was discovered in 1972 by the local muezzin and farmer Latif Acar when he was trying to discover where the water disappeared to when he was tending his crops. He uncovered one underground room which later turned out to be a whole "city" which might have housed an incredible 60,000 people for up to three months at a time. A total of 10 floors were discovered, dropping to a depth of 40m below ground, although only four are open to the public.

== See also ==
- Churches of Göreme, Turkey
- Derinkuyu Underground City
- Kaymaklı Underground City
- Mokissos
- Amaseia, Amasya
