= Spiro Kostof =

American historian

Spiro Konstantine Kostof (7 May 1936, Istanbul – 7 December 1991, Berkeley) was a Turkish-born American leading architectural historian, and educator. He was a professor at the University of California, Berkeley. His books continue to be widely read and some are routinely used in collegiate courses on architectural history.

== Biography ==
Born in Turkey, of Greek and Bulgarian ethnic origin, Kostof was educated at Istanbul's Robert College. He came to the United States in 1957 for graduate work at Yale University. Although he intended to major in drama, his interests shifted to architectural history. He received his Ph.D. in 1961, then taught at Yale for four years, before moving to the University of California, Berkeley, to join the faculty of the College of Environmental Design. He was to remain at Berkeley for the duration of his career.

Kostof's approach to architectural history emphasized urbanism as well as architecture and showed how architectural works are embedded in their physical and social contexts. Commonly accepted today, Kostof's approach was a break with previous directions in architectural history which tended to emphasize the sequence of styles and to study architectural works in relative isolation from their settings. Kostof's textbook, A History of Architecture: Settings and Rituals (1985) embodied these ideas and soon became one of the standard texts in the field.

In 1987, Kostof hosted a five-part PBS series, America by Design.

Kostof's publications were wide-ranging and included The Architect: Chapters in the History of the Profession; The City Shaped: Urban Patterns and Meanings Through History; America by Design; and The City Assembled: Elements of Urban Form through History.

== Namesake award ==
In 1993, following Kostof's death, the Society of Architectural Historians established the "Spiro Kostof Book Award", to recognize "interdisciplinary studies of urban history that make the greatest contribution to our understanding of the growth and development of cities."

== Books ==
- Kostof, Spiro, The Architect: Chapters in the History of the Profession, Oxford University Press, 1977; third edition, University of California Press, Berkeley Los Angeles London 2000.
- Kostof, Spiro, A History of Architecture: Settings and Rituals, Oxford University Press, New York Oxford 1985; second edition 1995.
- Kostof, Spiro, America by Design, Oxford University Press, New York 1987.
- Kostof, Spiro, Caves of God: Cappadocia and its Churches Publisher: Oxford University Press, 1989 ISBN 0-19-506000-8 ISBN 978-0195060003
- Kostof, Spiro, The City Shaped: Urban Patterns and Meanings Through History, Bullfinch Press 1991; second edition, Thames & Hudson, New York 1999
- Kostof, Spiro, The City Assembled: Elements of Urban Form through History, Little Brown, Boston 1992; second printing Thames & Hudson New York 2005.

== See also ==
- Byzantine architecture
- Byzantine Revival architecture
