= Mokissos =

Town of ancient Cappadocia

Coordinates: 38°11′08″N 34°12′26″E

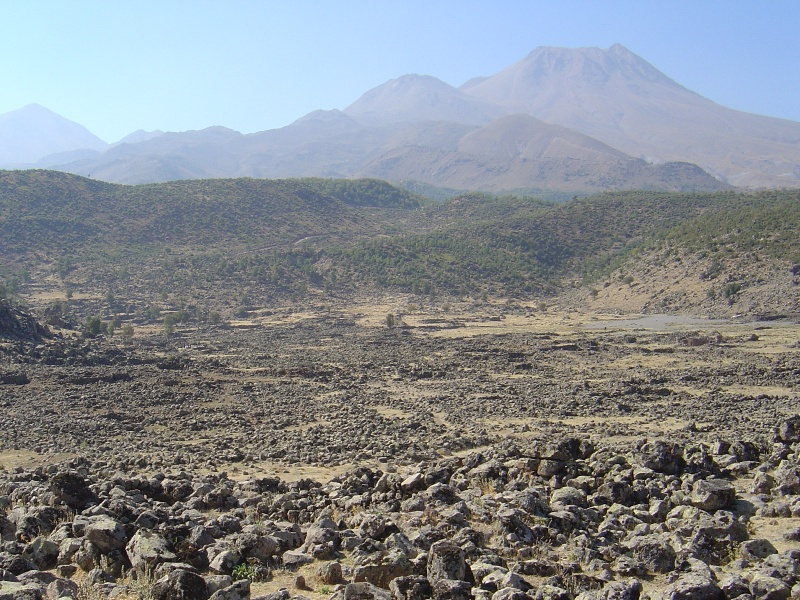
Mokissos with Mount Hasan

Mokissos or Mokisos (Ancient Greek: Μωκισσός or Μωκησός) or Mokison (Μωκισόν) was a town of ancient Cappadocia. The Romans called the city Mocisus or Mocissus, and Mocisum. Stephanus of Byzantium calls the town Moukissos (Μουκισσός).

Mocissus was the place where the allied forces of Eumenes II of Pergamon and Ariarathes IV of Cappadocia encamped during their advance against Pharnaces I of Pontus. While stationed there, they learned that Roman envoys had arrived to mediate the conflict and push for a settlement.

Following major reconstruction and fortification work by the Byzantine Emperor Justinian (527-565), it was renamed Justinianopolis (Ἰουστινιανούπολις). Justinian made Mocisus the capital of the province of Cappadocia Tertia, and elevated its bishopric to the rank of ecclesiastical metropolis, with an eparchia that stretched south of the Halys River (Turkish: Kızılırmak), the longest river of Asia Minor. The name Justinianopolis was retained until the end of Byzantine rule.

In the Synecdemus, the name appears as Rhegemoukisos (Ῥεγεμουκισός) and Rhegekoukisos (Ῥεγεκουκισός), the latter evidently an error.

Mokissos is also the formal name for a now inactive Diocese of the Greek Orthodox Church. The current bishop of Mokissos is Demetrios.

Its site is located near Helvadere, Asiatic Turkey.

== See also ==
- Churches of Göreme, Turkey
