= Huda =

Huda may refer to:

== People with the name ==
- Huda (given name), an index of people with the given name
- Huda (surname), an index of people with the surname

== Entities with the name ==
- Haryana Urban Development Authority (HUDA), the urban planning agency of the Haryana state, India
- Hyderabad Urban Development Authority, the urban planning agency of the city of Hyderabad India that was expanded and renamed Hyderabad Metropolitan Development Authority
- ST Huda, a tugboat operated by Kuwait Oil Company from 1954 to 1965, and then by H H Deeb, until 1967
- Huda TV, a satellite television channel in Saudi Arabia

== Education ==
- Al Huda Central School, Kadampuzha, Indian school
- Al-Huda Institute, a series of Islamic educational institutions for women in Pakistan and Canada
- Al Huda School (Maryland), school in Maryland
- Al-Huda School (New Jersey), school in New Jersey
- Darul Huda Islamic University, Indian University
- Jamiatul Ilm Wal Huda, British boarding school

== Mosques ==
- Baitul Huda Mosque, Sydney, mosque in Australia
- Baitul Huda Mosque, Usingen, mosque in Germany
- Masjid Al-Huda, mosque in Singapore
- Nurul Huda Mosque, mosque in Indonesia

== Commercial businesses ==
- Huda Beauty, cosmetics line
- Huda Beer, brand owned by Carlsberg Group
- Huda Tower, MIDROC headquarters in Ethiopia

== Places ==
- HUDA City Centre metro station, Indian terminal station
- Huda Jama, Slovenian settlement
- Huda Polica, Slovenian settlement
- Qubaybat Abu al-Huda, Syrian village

== Other ==
- Huda Boss, American reality television show
- Kitab al-Huda, religious book
- Shamsul Huda Stadium, stadium in Bangladesh

== See also ==
- Hoda (disambiguation)
- Houda (given name)
- Houda (surname)
- Khuda, Persian word for "God"
