= Huda (given name) =

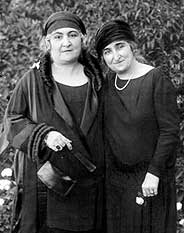
Huda and Safiya Zaghloul

Huda (English: /ˈhʊdə/; Arabic: هُدى) is a female name in Arabic, sometimes spelled as Houda or Hoda which means "right guidance". Notable people with the name include:

== Media with this Name ==
- Al Huda Tv Official Islamic Media Contents, Al-Huda-TV

== Females with this first name ==
- Huda Abuarquob (born 1970), Palestinian peace activist
- Huda al-Attas (born 1970), Yemeni writer
- Huda al-Baan (born 1960), Yemeni politician
- Huda Akil (born 1945), American neuroscientist
- Huda Ben Amer, Libyan politician
- Huda Ammori (born 1994), British activist
- Huda Kattan (born 1983), Iraqi-American beauty product developer, CEO of Huda Beauty
- Huda Hussein (born 1965), Kuwaiti actress and producer
- Hüda Kaya (born 1960), Turkish politician
- Huda Lutfi (born 1948), Egyptian artist
- Huda Mukbil, Canadian activist
- Huda Mustafa (born 2000), American social media influencer and contestant of Love Island USA
- Huda Naamani (1930–2020), Lebanese writer
- Huda Naccache, Israeli model
- Huda Otoum (born 1963), Jordanian politician
- Huda Sajjad Mahmoud Shaker, (born 1978), Iraqi politician
- Huda Salih Mahdi Ammash (born 1953), Iraqi scientist
- Huda Sha'arawi (1879–1947), Egyptian political activist
- Huda Sultan (1925–2006), Egyptian actress and singer
- Huda Totonji, Saudi Arabian artist
- Huda Ziad (born 1983), Pakistani cricketer
- Huda Zoghbi (born 1955), Lebanese medical researcher

== Males with this first name ==
- Huda bin Abdul Haq (1960–2008), Indonesian mass murder

== Construct name ==
- Nazmul Huda Bachchu (1938–2017), Bangladeshi actor
- Noor ul Huda Shah, Pakistani dramatist and politician
- Nurul Huda Abdullah (born 1972), Malaysian swimmer
- S. H. Bihari (Shamsul Huda Bihari) (1922–1987), Indian music director, songwriter and poet
- Shams-ul-Huda Shams (1938–2005), Afghan politician
- Shamsul Huda Chaudhury (1920–2000), Bangladeshi politician

== See also ==
- Huda (disambiguation)
- Huda (surname)
- Hoda (given name)
- Houda (given name)
