= Kayali (company) =

Cosmetics company

- Industry: Cosmetic; fragrance
- Founded: 2018; 8 years ago
- Founder: Huda Kattan; Mona Kattan
- Headquarters: Dubai, United Arab Emirates
- Key people: Mona Kattan (CEO)
- Owners: Mona Kattan; General Atlantic
- Number of employees: 130 (2025)

Kayali is a Dubai-based cosmetics company co-founded by sisters Mona and Huda Kattan in 2018. Established as a fragrance brand under Huda Beauty, which the sisters also co-founded, the business now operates independently, jointly owned by chief executive officer Mona Kattan and American private equity firm General Atlantic.

== History and operations ==
Kayali was co-founded in the United Arab Emirates in November 2018 by sisters Mona and Huda Kattan. It originally launched as a fragrance brand under Huda Beauty, which the sisters co-founded in 2013. Mona and her father Ibrahim Yahya Kattan named Kayali after the Arabic word for "my imagination".

In 2025, Huda Beauty divested ownership in Kayali. Kayali now operates as an independent company with Mona Kattan and private equity firm General Atlantic as owners. Mona Kattan is also the chief executive officer. The company's headquarters is located in Dubai, United Arab Emirates. Kayali launched a website and direct-to-consumer platform in 2025. The company had approximately 130 employees in November 2025.

Kayali fragrances are carried by retailers Sephora, ASOS, Cult Beauty, Harrods, Selfridges, and Boots. In 2024, the company expanded its availability to Mexico and the Philippines. By the end of 2024, Kayali products were sold in 2,690 retail stores in 30 countries.

Kayali won Fragrance of the Year – Women's Prestige at the Fragrance Foundation Awards, presented by The Fragrance Foundation.

=== Products ===
On November 16, 2018, Kayali launched with four perfumes: "Elixir | 11", "Citrus | 08", "Musk | 12", and "Vanilla | 28". The diamond-shaped bottles are a reference to the traditional crystal oud bottles commonly found in the souks in Dubai. The fragrances are manufactured in France by the Swiss company DSM-Firmenich. The numbers in each product name indicate how many rounds of formulation it took to achieve the final product.

According to Entrepreneur, the initial fragrances were designed to introduce the practice of fragrance layering in Arab culture to the Western world. Vogue Arabia has credited Kayali and Mona Kattan with introducing perfume layering to a global audience. Kayali launched eight fragrances in 2023 and an additional seven in 2024. With the introduction of "Fleur Majesty Rose Royale | 31" in March 2025, Kayali's product line-up now includes 27 fragrances.

In January 2025, Kayali launched a cologne line called Dapper Daddy in partnership with Ibrahim Kattan. Saffron Oud is the debut scent. Kayali launched a line called Freedom with four new scents in November 2025.

== See also ==
- List of companies of the United Arab Emirates
