= Hoda (disambiguation) =

Hoda Kotb is an American broadcast journalist, television personality, and author.

Hoda may also refer to:

== People ==
- Hoda (given name)
- Hoda (surname)

== Other ==
- Al-Hoda, Arabic language newspaper in New York City (NYC)
- Jamatia Hoda, Indian cultural institution
- Undu Hoda Kondu Hoda, 1992 Indian Kannada film
- Shahrak-e Alam ol Hoda, Iranian village
- Shahrak-e Benat ol Hoda, Iranian village

== See also ==
- Nishi-Hōda Station, Japanese railway station
- Today with Hoda & Jenna
- Houda (given name)
- Houda (surname)
- Huda (disambiguation)
- Khoda (Khuda), Persian word for "God"
