= Hoda (given name) =

Hoda is a given name (alternate spellings include Houda and Huda) of Arabic origin. Notable people with that name include:

== Female given name ==
- Hoda Abdel-Hamid, a war correspondent with Al Jazeera
- Hoda Ablan (born 1971), Yemeni poet
- Hoda Afshar (born 1983), Iranian-Australian photographer
- Hoda Ali, British human rights activist
- Hoda Barakat (born 1952), Lebanese writer
- Hoda ElMaraghy (born 1945), Canadian professor
- Hoda Elsadda, a Professor of English and Comparative Literature at Cairo University
- Hoda Haddad (born 1944), Lebanese singer and actress
- Hoda Kotb (born 1964), American journalist
- Hoda Lattaf (born 1978), French football player
- Hoda Mahmoudi, Iranian-American sociologist
- Hoda Muthana (born 1994), American Islamist
- Hoda Saad (born 1981), Moroccan singer-songwriter

== Male given name ==
- Hoda Saber (1959–2011), an Iranian intellectual, economic scholar, journalist and social-political activist

== See also ==
- Hoda (disambiguation)
- Hoda (surname)
- Houda (given name)
- Huda (given name)
