= Huda (surname) =

Huda (Arabic: هُدى) is a gender neutral name, pronounced: /ˈhʊdə/ (sometimes spelled as Hoda or Houda) which means "right guidance". This page indexes people who use the name as their surname.

It may refer to:

== Females with the surname ==
- Foujia Huda (born 1985), Bangladeshi sprinter
- Sigma Huda, Bangladeshi lawyer
- Velia Abdel-Huda (1916 – 2012), Egyptian historian

== Males with the surname ==
- Ashraful Huda, Bangladesh police officer
- Choirul Huda (1979 – 2017), Indonesian footballer
- Khoirul Huda (born 1989), Indonesian footballer
- Menhaj Huda (born 1967), British director and producer
- Mohammad Bazlul Huda, Bangladeshi Army officer
- Nazmul Huda, Bangladeshi politician
- Norbert Huda (born 1950), German diver
- Qamar-ul Huda, Pakistani-American religious scholar
- Riyazul Huda, Bangladeshi cricketer
- Suleman Huda, (born 1975), Pakistani cricketer
- Tawfik Abu al-Huda (1894 – 1956), Jordanian Prime minister

== Arabic-based compound names with Huda as an element ==
- Nur ul-Huda
- Shams ul-Huda

== See also ==
- Huda (disambiguation)
- Huda (given name)
- Hoda (surname)
- Houda (surname)
