= Hoda (surname) =

Hoda is a surname (alternate spellings include Houda and Huda). Notable people with that name include:

- Jamileh Alam al-Hoda, wife of President of Iran, Ebrahim Raisi
- Mansur Hoda (1930–2001), Indian Technologist
- Noor-ol-Hoda Mangeneh, Iranian writer
- Sayyid Ahmad al-Hoda, Iranian cleric
- Seyed Abdol Javad al-Hoda, Iranian cleric
- Surur Hoda (1928–2003) Indian politician
- Syed A. Hoda, American-Pakistani academic

== See also ==
- Hoda (disambiguation)
- Hoda (given name)
- Houda (surname)
- Huda (surname)
