= Noor (name) =

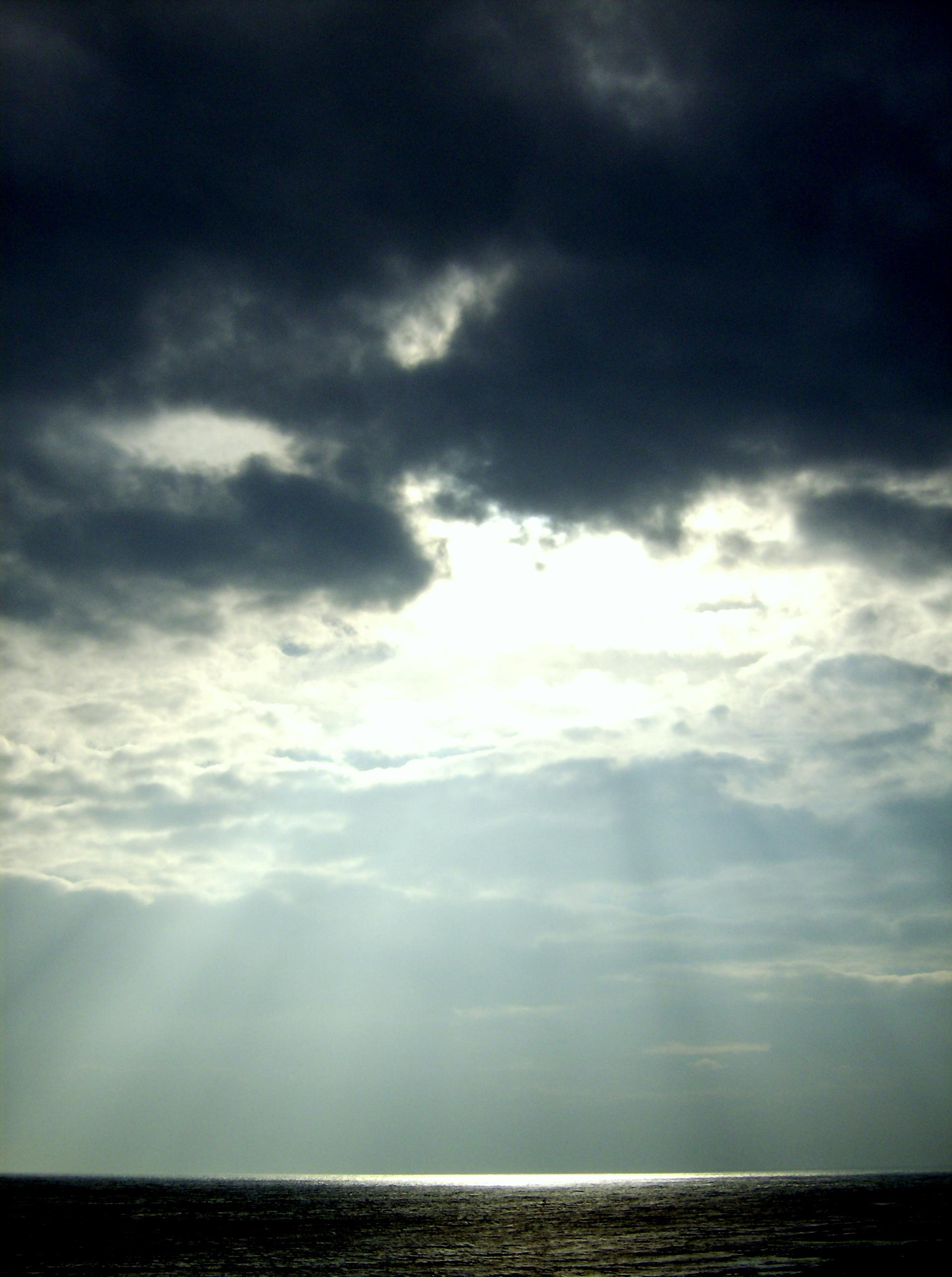
- The name Noor means "light"
- Pronunciation: [ˈnuːɾ]
- Gender: Unisex

Origin
- Origin: Arabic
- Meaning: "light"

Noor (also spelt Nur, Nor, Nour, or Noer, Arabic: نور: Nūr IPA: [nuːr]) is a common Arabic unisex given name meaning 'light', from the Arabic al-Nur (النور). Feminine variants include Noora, Nora, Norah, Noura, and Nura. It is also used as a surname.

== Given name ==
=== Noor ===
- Queen Noor of Jordan (born 1951), Queen of Jordan
- Mohamed Noor bin Shamsuddin (born 1967), Malaysian actor
- Noor Abuarafeh (born 1986), Palestinian artist
- Noor Ahmad (born 2005), Afghan cricketer
- Noor Aishah binti Mohammad Salim (born 1933), Singaporean activist and scouting leader, spouse of the president
- Noor Alam (born 1929), Pakistani field hockey player
- Princess Noor bint Asem (born 1982), member of the Jordanian Royal Family
- Noor Bukhari (born 1976), Pakistani actress
- Noor Muhammad Butt (born 1936), Pakistani nuclear physicist
- S.H.M.B Noor Chowdhury (born 1946), Bangladesh Army officer
- Noor van Crevel (1929–2019), Dutch social worker, feminist and lesbian activist
- Noor Dean (born 1946), Indo-Fijian lawyer
- Noor Islam Dawar (died 2021), Pakistani Pashtun human rights activist
- Noor Hassanali (born 1918), President of Trinidad and Tobago
- Noor Jehan (born 1926), Pakistani singer and actress
- Noor Inayat Khan (born 1914), Indian-born British SOE agent
- Noor Askuzaimey Mat Salim (born 1985), Malaysian boccia player
- Noor Sabri (born 1984), Iraqi footballer
- Noor Tagouri (born 1993), American journalist and activist
- Noor Holsboer, (born 1967), Dutch field hockey player
- Noor Vidts, (born 1996), Belgian athlete

=== Nour ===
- Nour (Marian Farid Abi Habib) (born 1977), Lebanese actress
- Nour Ahmed Youssri (born 2003), Egyptian badminton player
- Nour Belkhiria (born 1995), Tunisian-Canadian actress
- Nour El-Sherif (born 1946), Egyptian actor
- Nour El-Sayed (born 1984), Egyptian footballer
- Nour Mansour (born 1989), Lebanese footballer
- Nour Mhanna (born 1966), Syrian singer
- Nour Ardakani (born 2001), Lebanese singer and dancer
- Al-Nour al-Qubba, Sudanese general

=== Nur ===
==== Politicians, statesmen, and royalty ====
- Nur ibn Mujahid (died 1567), 16th-century Somali Emir of Harar
- Sultan Nur Ahmed Aman (born 1841), leader of the Habr Yunis clan
- Nur Bekri (born 1961), high-ranking Chinese politician
- Nur Alam (born 1967), Indonesian governor of South East Sulawesi
- Noer Hassan Wirajuda (born 1948), Indonesian minister of foreign affairs
- Nur Ahmad Jan Bughra (died 1934), Uighur Emir of the First East Turkestan Republic
- Nur Jahan (born 1577), Mughal Empress
- Nur Devlet (died 1503), khan of the Crimean Khanate
- Nur Matan Abdi, Somali politician and military commander
- Nursultan Abishuly Nazarbayev (born 1940), first President of Kazakhstan
- Musa Nur Amin, Somali politician
- Nur Mohammed Taraki, Afghan politician (1917–1979), Chairman of the Revolutionary Council of the Republic of Afghanistan

==== Sportspeople ====
- Cansu Nur Kaya (born 2000), Turkish footballer
- Ceren Nur Domaç (born 1999), Turkish volleyball player
- Esma Nur Çakmak (born 2004), Turkish arm wrestler
- Gamze Nur Yaman (born 1999), Turkish footballer
- Nur B. Ali (born 1974), Pakistani-American racecar driver
- Nur Banu Özpak (born 1996), Turkish sport shooter
- Nur Mustafa Gülen (born 1960), Turkish footballer and coach
- Nur Nurhan Çakmak (born 1981), Turkish women's footballer
- Büşra Nur Tırıklı (born 1994), Turkish Paralympian discus thrower
- Merve Nur Eroğlu (born 1993), Turkish Paralympic archer
- Nur Atikah Nabilah (born 1991), Singaporean gymnast
- Seda Nur İncik (born 2000), Turkish footballer
- Şeyma Nur Emeksiz Bacaksız (born 1993), Turkish Para Taekwondo practitioner
- Ünzile Nur Hacıoğlu (born 1999), Turkish volleyball player
- Zeynep Nur Agin (born 2007), Turkish karateka
- Zeynep Nur Kapaklıkaya (born 2000), Turkish handballer

==== Others ====
- Nur Batur (born 1952), Turkish journalist
- Nur Fettahoğlu (born 1980), Turkish German actress
- Nur Sürer (born 1954), Turkish actress
- Nur Hossain (1961–1987), Bangladeshi activist
- Nur Khan (1923–2011), Pakistan Air Force officer
- Nur Yalman (born 1931), Turkish anthropologist
- Cak Nur (born 1939), Indonesian Muslim intellectual
- Nur Ali Elahi (born 1895), Iranian philosopher, jurist, and musician

== Surname ==
- Ayman Nour (born 1964), Egyptian politician
- Meraj Khalid Noor (born 1980), Indian politician
- Mohamed Noor, American biologist and geneticist
- Mohammad Noor (1901–1979), Indonesian politician
- Mohammed Noor (born 1978), Saudi Arabian footballer
- Muhammad Noor (born 1925), Indian footballer
- Mudyat Noor (born 1979), Regent of North Penajam Paser, East Kalimantan (2025–2030)
- Farah Nur (1862–1932), Somali poet and warrior
- Mariam Nour (born 1936), Lebanese television personality
- Nur Ahmed Nur (1937–2024), Afghan communist
- Omar Nour (born 1978), Egyptian triathlete
- Rıza Nur (1879–1942), Turkish surgeon
- Sabila Noor (born 1995), Bangladeshi actress
- Nabela Noor (born 1991), Bengali-American entrepreneur and online influencer
- Shajal Noor (born 1983), Bangladeshi actor
- Stephanie Nur (born 1988), Egyptian actress
- Yusuf Haji Nur (died 2019), Somali politician

== Fictional characters ==
=== Noor ===
- Noor, an older lady who attempts to groom Saroo in Lion
- Noor Pradesh, a fictional female character in the Miss Peregrine's Home for Peculiar Children series, first appearing in the fourth entry, A Map of Days
- Noor, the main character and player character in Monument Valley 3
- Noor, one of the nine default skins in Minecraft

=== Nour ===
- Nour, young boy in J. M. G. Le Clézio's novel Désert
- Nour El Deen Mahmoud Nour El Deen, a fictional character in Malaf Al Mostakbal series
- Nour, the young Syrian-American protagonist of the novel The Map of Salt and Stars by Zeyn Joukhadar

=== Nur ===
- En Sabah Nur, a supervillain appearing in comic books published by Marvel Comics
- Nur the Vlogger Fairy, a supporting character in the Rainbow Magic book franchise
- Sude Nur Aslan (born 2007), Turkish boxer

== Compound names using Nur ==
The following names are Arabic-based compound names with Nur as an element:

- Nurullah, that is Nur Allah, meaning light of God
- Nurul Alam (disambiguation), that is Nur al-Alam, meaning light of the world
- Nurul Amin (disambiguation), that is Nur al-Amin, meaning light of the trustworthy
- Nur al-Din, that is Nur al-Din, meaning light of the religion/faith
- Nur ul-Hasan, that is Nur al-Hasan, meaning light of Hasan
  - Saiyid Nurul Hasan (1921–1993), Indian historian
  - Quazi Nurul Hasan Sohan (born 1993), Bangladeshi cricketer
  - Prof. Syed Nurul Hasan College, West Bengal
- Nur ul-Huda, that is Nur al-Huda, meaning light of the guidance
- Nurul Islam, that is Nur al-Islam, meaning light of Islam
- Nurur Rahman, that is Nur al-Rahman, meaning light of the Most Merciful Allah
  - Nurur Rahman, Bangladeshi professor and politician from Comilla
  - Sayyid Mohammad Nurur Rahman Barkati, Shahi Imam of West Bengal
- Nuruzzaman, that is Nur al-Zaman, meaning light of the era
- Abdel Nour, that is Abd an-Nur, meaning servant of the Light
- Nuri, meaning luminous or my light
- Núria, a Catalan girl's name, has been suggested to be related to this name
