= Fat Mascara =

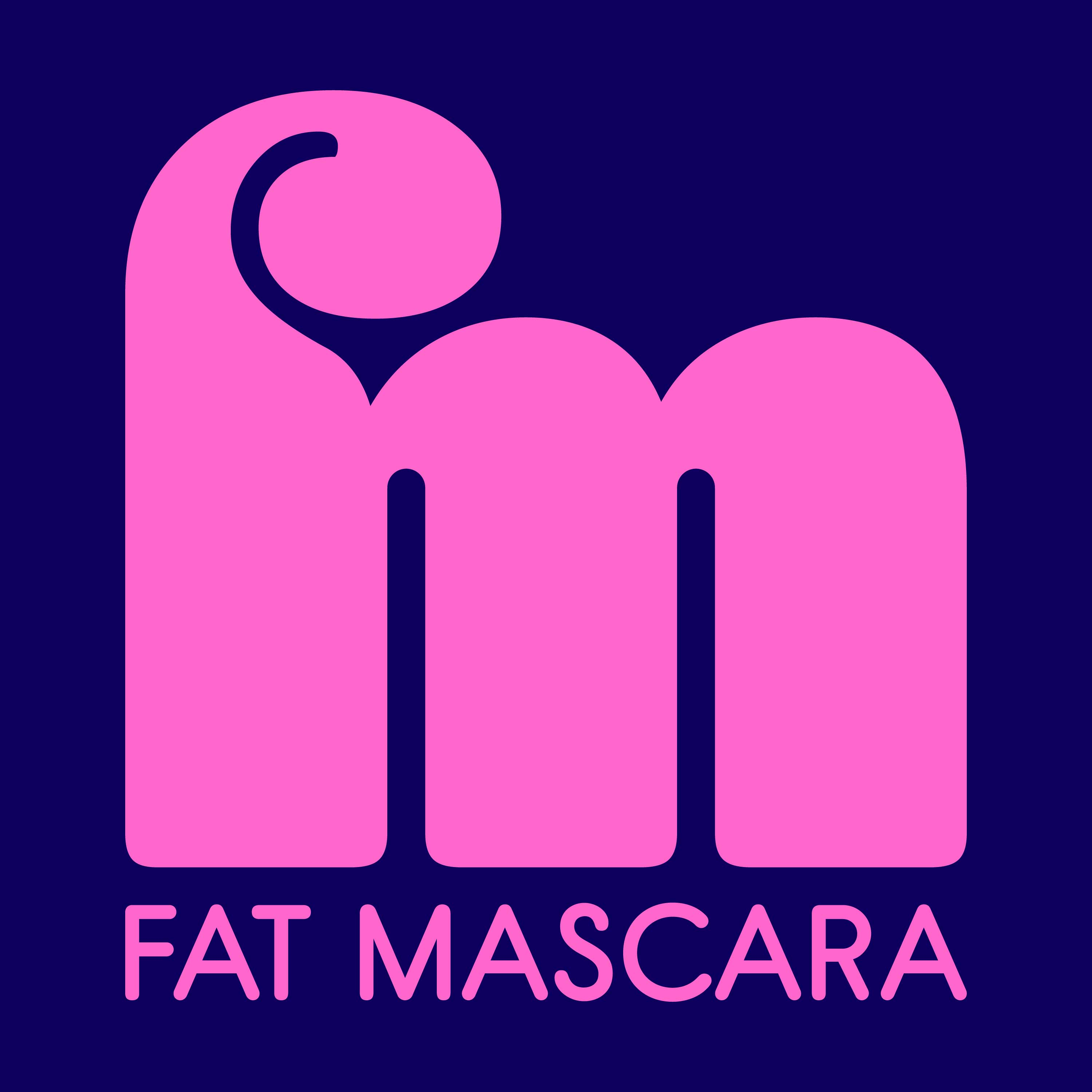

Cast and voices
- Hosted by: Jennifer G. Sullivan and Jessica Matlin

Publication
- Original release: February, 2016

Related
- Website: fatmascara.com

Fat Mascara is a beauty podcast hosted by journalists Jessica Matlin and Jennifer G. Sullivan. Matlin was the beauty director of Harper's Bazaar and is currently the beauty director of Moda Operandi, and Sullivan was the beauty and health director of Marie Claire and is currently a columnist for New York magazine's The Cut.

== About ==
The first episode of the podcast was released in February 2016. The podcast was originally produced by Embassy Row and is now produced independently and part of the Acast Creator Network.

On the podcast Matlin and Sullivan discuss beauty news and tips and interview celebrities and beauty professionals. Pasts guest include Gwen Stefani, Tracee Ellis Ross, Kim Kardashian, and Jane Fonda; Glossier founder Emily Weiss; hairstylists Guido Palau, Jen Atkin, and Nikki Nelms; and makeup artists Mario Dedivanovic and Charlotte Tilbury.

== History ==
In 2016 Fat Mascara won the Refinery29 Beauty Innovator Award for Social Media Supernova. In 2020, the show was nominated for the Best Beauty & Fashion Podcast award at the iHeartRadio Podcast Awards.

In 2023, Duane Morris Attorney and Kelly Bonner came on the podcast to talk about Cosmetic Regulations.
