= Mona Kattan =

Iraqi-American entrepreneur

Mona Kattan Elamin
- Born: May 4, 1985 (age 41); Oklahoma, United States
- Education: Bachelor's degree in finance
- Alma mater: American University of Sharjah
- Occupation: CEO of Kayali Fragrances
- Television: Huda Boss; Dubai Bling
- Relatives: Huda Kattan (sister)

Mona Kattan Elamin (born Mona Monica Kattan; May 4, 1985) is an Iraqi-American entrepreneur. She is the chief executive officer of the fragrance brand Kayali and a co-founder of Huda Beauty.

== Early life and education ==
Mona Kattan was born to Iraqi parents in Oklahoma in 1985. She has two sisters and a brother. Her family moved to Massachusetts during her teenage years and later relocated to the United Arab Emirates in 2003 following the September 11 attacks, due to increased discrimination. Kattan graduated from the Sharjah American International School and earned a Bachelor's degree in finance from the American University of Sharjah in 2008.

== Career ==
Kattan began her career in investment banking in 2008. In 2013, she co-founded the cosmetics company Huda Beauty with her sisters. In 2018, she co-founded the fragrance brand Kayali with her sister Huda, becoming its chief executive officer in 2025 after Huda Beauty sold its ownership of Kayali. Kattan also co-founded HB Investments in 2018, a firm that has supported businesses such as Fresha, Humantra, and Ketish.

In 2018, Kattan appeared in the Facebook Watch reality series Huda Boss and joined the cast of the Netflix reality series Dubai Bling for its second season in 2023 and third season in 2025. In 2025, Kattan and her father opened an Iraqi restaurant, Daddy Cool's Kitchen, in the Dubai Hills Mall.
