= Kadampuzha Devi Temple =

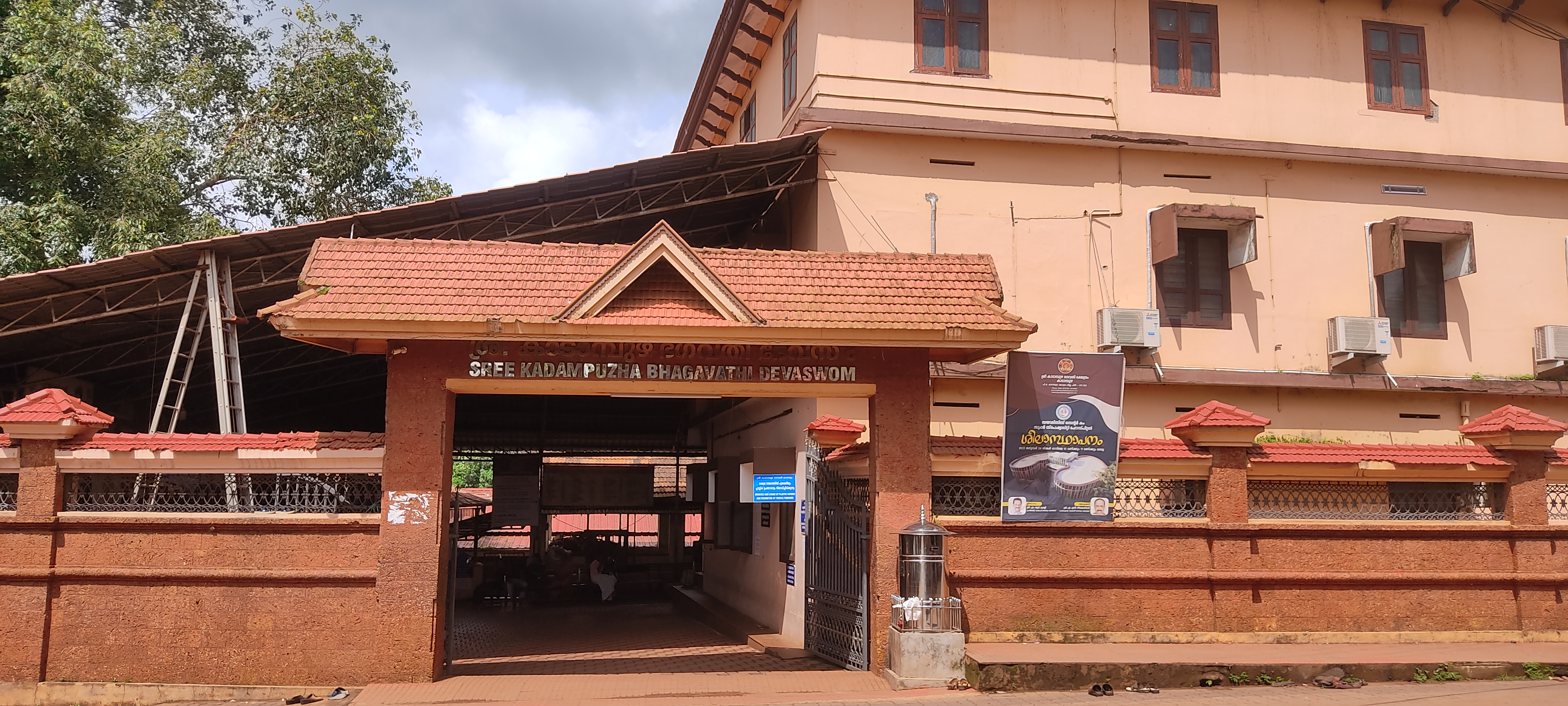

- Devi Temple, Kadampuzha, Malappuram, Kerala

Religion
- Affiliation: Hinduism
- District: Malappuram
- Deity: Goddess Parvati
- Festival: Laksharchana

Location
- Location: Kadampuzha
- State: Kerala
- Country: India
- Coordinates: 10.943935°N 76.043513°E

Architecture
- Elevation: 130.7 m (429 ft)

Website
- https://www.kadampuzhadevaswom.com/

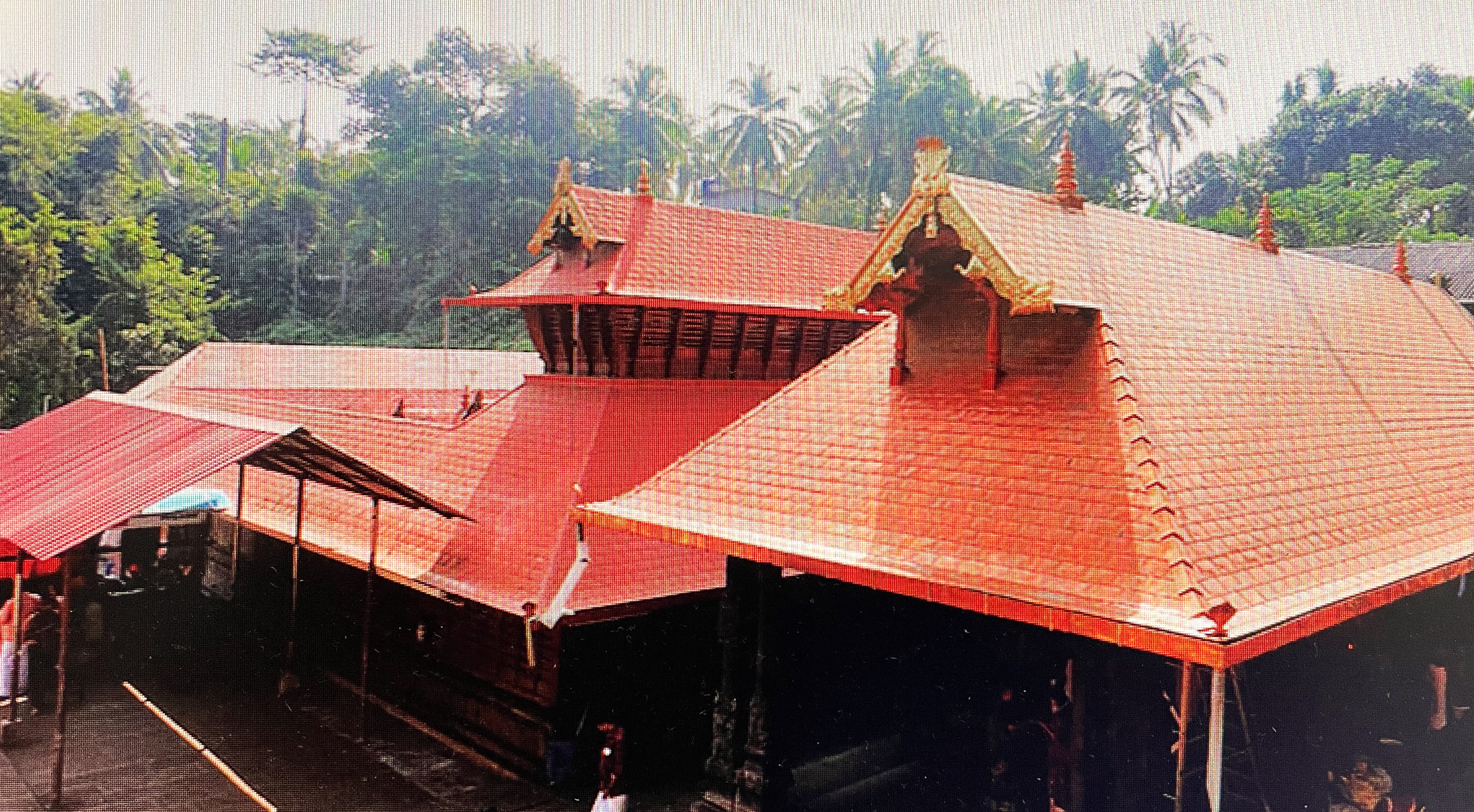
Kadampuzha Temple

Kadampuzha Devi Temple is a Hindu temple and pilgrimage center at Kadampuzha in Malappuram district, Kerala, India. The main deity of this temple is Goddess Parvati in the form of a huntress. There is no idol of Goddess in this temple, and she is worshipped in a pit. The presence of Lord Ganesha is also believed to be with the Goddess, and there are sub-shrines for Lord Sastha and serpent deities. A separate Shiva temple exists near the temple, called 'Madambiyarkavu'. Both these temples are under the control of Malabar Devaswom Board.

== Legend ==
The story of Kadmpuzha is tied to the epic Mahabharata. During the exile of Pandavas, Arjuna performed a deep penance here to gain the Pashupatastra from Lord Shiva. Shiva decided to test Arjuna and remove his ego that he was the most powerful. Shiva and Parvati disguised as hunters and came where Arjuna was meditating. At that time an Asura named Mukasura disguised himself as a wild boar and came to attak Arjuna. Shiva and Arjuna both arrowed at the boar at the same time which led to the argument who killed it. Arjuna used many celestial weapons (Astras) against Shiva.

== Offerings ==
The importance of performing Vazhivadus in this temple is that the devotees are facilitated to witness the Vazhivadu performance by posing at the door step of the Sreekovil which is closer to the idol as there is no Sopanam in front of the Sreekovil.

The most important Vazhivadus here are the Poomoodal and Muttarukkal. Devotees can book the offering through the official online website : https://www.kadampuzhadevaswom.in/

Various other Vazhivadus can also be performed, the details of which are provided elsewhere.

Pooja Name
Muttarukkal
Thrikalapooja
Rekthapushpanjali
Dehapushpanjali
Maala
Neyvilakku
GanapathiHomam
Kedavilakku
Pattucharthal
Elluthiri

== Timings ==
- Darsana timings will be : 04.30 AM to 12.00 Noon. >> 03.30 PM to 07.00 PM
- Vazhipadu Counters Timings : 05.00 AM to 11.00 AM. >> 03.30 PM to 05.00 PM

== Festivals ==
Thanthrik Festivals (Poushtika Karmas)

Rigveda Laksharchana

In the month of Dhanu, Rigveda Laksharchana, under the auspices of the thanthri and attended by Vedic scholars, is performed for eight days. The Rigveda Archana commences in the early hours of each day and Abhisheka is performed in the evening.

Cultural programs are held during the first seven days staging temple arts and art forms, and is attended by large audiences and many dignitaries.

Dravya Kalasam

Dravya Kalasam in the month of Thulam is conducted with its thanthrik and ritualistic varieties for 8 days under the auspices of Temple Thanthri. The Dravya Kalasam will commence with Aacharyavaranam, Mulayidal, Praasdasudhi, Rakshoknahoma, Asthrakalasa, Vaasthukalasa, Dhara, Sudhi, Homas, Thatwahoma, and finally concludes with Brahmakalasa Abhisekha accompanied by Valiyapani and Melavadhyams etc.

Murajapam: A special thanthri pooja is performed one day every month followed by Murajapa recitaitons by vedic scholars.

== See also ==
- Kadampuzha Temple Malayalam Wiki
- Temples of Kerala
- Vairankode Bhagavathy Temple
- Vairankode Vela
