= Noor Tagouri =

American journalist and activist (born 1993)

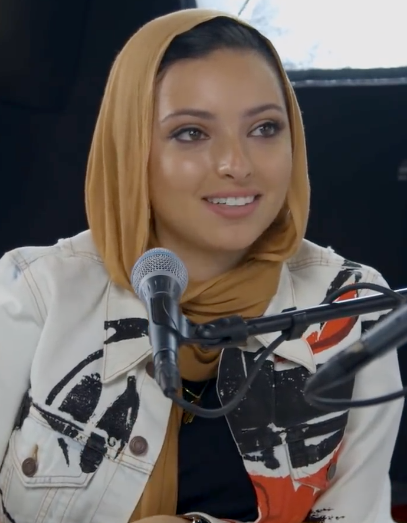
- Tagouri in 2018
- Born: November 27, 1993 (age 32); West Virginia, United States
- Education: University of Maryland
- Occupations: Activist, model, journalist
- Spouse: Adam Khafif (m. 2017)
- Website: www.noortagouri.com

Noor Tagouri (born November 27, 1993) is an American journalist, activist, motivational speaker and producer of the documentary series on the mistreatment of people with mental disabilities titled The Trouble They've Seen: The Forest Haven Story, and of a podcast-series on sex trafficking in the U.S.-titled Sold in America: Inside Our Nation's Sex Trade. In 2016, she became the first hijab-wearing Muslim woman to appear, fully clothed, in an issue of Playboy magazine.

== Education ==
Tagouri attended Prince George's Community College from 2010 to 2011. She also holds a Bachelor of Arts degree from the University of Maryland, with a major in broadcast journalism and a minor in international development and conflict management.

== Career ==
Tagouri started her broadcasting career in June 2012 working as an intern with the CBS Radio. After the death of Freddie Grey in 2015, a local Maryland TV station sent her to cover protests in Baltimore. She also worked for CTV News as a reporter for almost 2 years. In June 2016, she joined Newsy, an online video news site based in Washington, D.C., as an anchor and producer. She initiated a social media campaign in December 2012 called LetNoorShine.

In 2019, Tagouri partnered with Pulse Films to create a new documentary show, :In America With Noor that will explore "a wide range of controversial subjects and how they affect daily American life and culture."

Her experiences led her to launch her own production company, At Your Service.

== Podcasts ==
Tagouri's podcast Sold in America gave a window into the sex trade industry in the United States. It was released on Facebook Watch, Amazon, and Hulu. The podcast had been downloaded more than 1.5 million times as of early 2021.

In 2020, she launched Podcast Noor.

== Social impact initiatives ==
In 2018 Tagouri, along with her mother Salwa Tagouri, launched the ISeeYou foundation to amplify the voices of the unheard and unseen.

== Personal life ==
In 2016, Tagouri became engaged to Adam Khafif. The couple were married on 20 May 2017 in Miami.
