= Luna Daily =

Personal care company

- Industry: Cosmetics
- Founded: November 25, 2019; 6 years ago
- Founder: Katy Cottam (CEO)
- Headquarters: London, United Kingdom
- Key people: Sarah Watt (Director); Jonathan Heilbron (Director)
- Number of employees: 4 (2022)
- Website: luna-daily.com

Luna Daily is a British cosmetics and feminine hygiene brand founded in London in 2019 by Katy Cottam.

== History ==
Luna Daily was founded in 2019, and is a privately held business headquartered in London, England. Luna Daily was conceived from founder Cottam's own experiences with using traditional bodycare products, and stigma associated with feminine hygiene products. Cottam herself having worked for major beauty and skincare brands L'Oréal and Charlotte Tilbury. Luna Daily is a manufacturer of female body care and intimate wellness products In the March 2023, Luna Daily secured $3.7m seed funding Redrice Ventures, Joyance, and Velocity Juice, as well as angel investors. In April 2023, Luna Daily was officially stocked in US based Sephora stores, and later in 2023 was stocked in British branches of Boots and online with ASOS.

In November 2023, Luna Daily launched their Vulva advertising campaign with advertising agency JOAN. The campaign included projecting the word Vulva onto the Tate Modern art gallery.

Moving in 2024, Luna Daily expanded their product line to include a new range for pregnancy, post-birth and beyond supporting new mothers. In July, Unilever Ventures invested over £2 million, and brings the brand’s total funding raised to date to £4.7 million.
