= Nur ul-Huda =

Nur ul-Huda (Arabic: نور الهدی; transliterations vary) is an Arabic phrase meaning light of the guidance. It may refer to

== Males ==
- Khan Mohammad Nurul Huda (born 1948), former Chief Election Commissioner of Bangladesh
- Mirza Nurul Huda (1919–1991), 3rd Vice President of Bangladesh
- Mohammad Nurul Huda (born 1949), Bangladeshi poet, novelist and musician
- Muhammad Nurul Huda, 17th Inspector General of Bangladesh Police
- Muhammad Nurul Huda (1949–2017), Bangladeshi politician
- Nurul Huda (born 1930), Manipuri politician
- Nurul Huda (born 1965), Assam politician

== Females ==
- Noor-ol-Hoda Mangeneh (born 1902), Iranian feminist writer
- Noorul Huda Shah (born 1952), Pakistani dramatist
- Nurul Huda Abdullah (born 1972), Malaysian swimmer

== Other ==
- Nurul Huda Mosque, Indonesia
- Nurul Huda Mosque of Gelgel, Bali, Indonesia

== See also ==
- Nur (name)
