= Al Huda Central School, Kadampuzha =

Al Huda Central School

Location
- Kadampuzha, Malappuram district, Kerala; India; 10.9290°N 76.0419°E

Information
- Type: Education and Institution
- Motto: To Seek, To Strive, To Find
- Established: 1993
- Category: CBSE
- Oversight: CBSE
- Trust: ALHUDA EDUCATIONAL SOCIETY
- School code: 75205
- Principal: Muraleedharan K.V
- Campus: 3.075 acres (12,460m²)
- Website: http://www.alhudacentralschool.com

Al Huda Central School, commonly known as Al Huda Central School, Kadampuzha, includes a primary upper primary, and secondary element in Marakkara Village of Kuttipuram. It was established in 1993. The school is managed by Pvt. Unaided. It is an English Medium, coeducational school. It is one of the premier English Medium Schools in Malappuarm District. It is situated about 11 km from Kadampuzha and Kanhippura.

== History ==
The institution was run by Majma-U-Thaskiyathil Islamiyya, Vettichira,

In 1999 the school became affiliated to CBSE Delhi.

== Description ==
The motto of the school is "To Seek, To Strive, To Find". Its performance in academic and non-academic fields demonstrates the school's commitment.

Al Huda Central School Kadampuzha has its own (private) building. The school has 27 classrooms. The lowest class is LKG and the highest is 10. This school has 10 male teachers and 29 female yeachers. A library facility is available in this school.

This school has a playground.
