= Huda Sajjad Mahmoud Shaker =

Iraqi politician

Huda Sajjad Mahmoud Shaker (Arabic: هدى سجاد محمود شاكر) (born 5 November 1978, العمر : ٤٣ سنة ), عدد الاولاد:٣ is an Iraqi politician from Najaf Governorate. She holds a bachelor's degree in chemistry. She served as a member of the Council of Representatives for the governorate of Qadisiyah in its second session (2010-2014) and the third session (2014-2018) for the State of Law Coalition inside Islamic Dawa Party. On 2016 was accused of extorting public officials to obtain money.
