= Kitab al-Huda =

The Kitab al-Huda ("The Book of Guidance") is a collection of canons and laws, of liturgical rules and short theological treatises dealing with Trinitarian and Christological problems. In the 11th century the Maronite Bishop David translated the Kitab al-Huda from Syriac to Arabic. The Maronites had retained their Syriac language and literature longer than the other Christian communities.
