= Houda Darwish =

Algerian novelist, poet, writer and women's rights activist

Houda Darwish هدى درويش
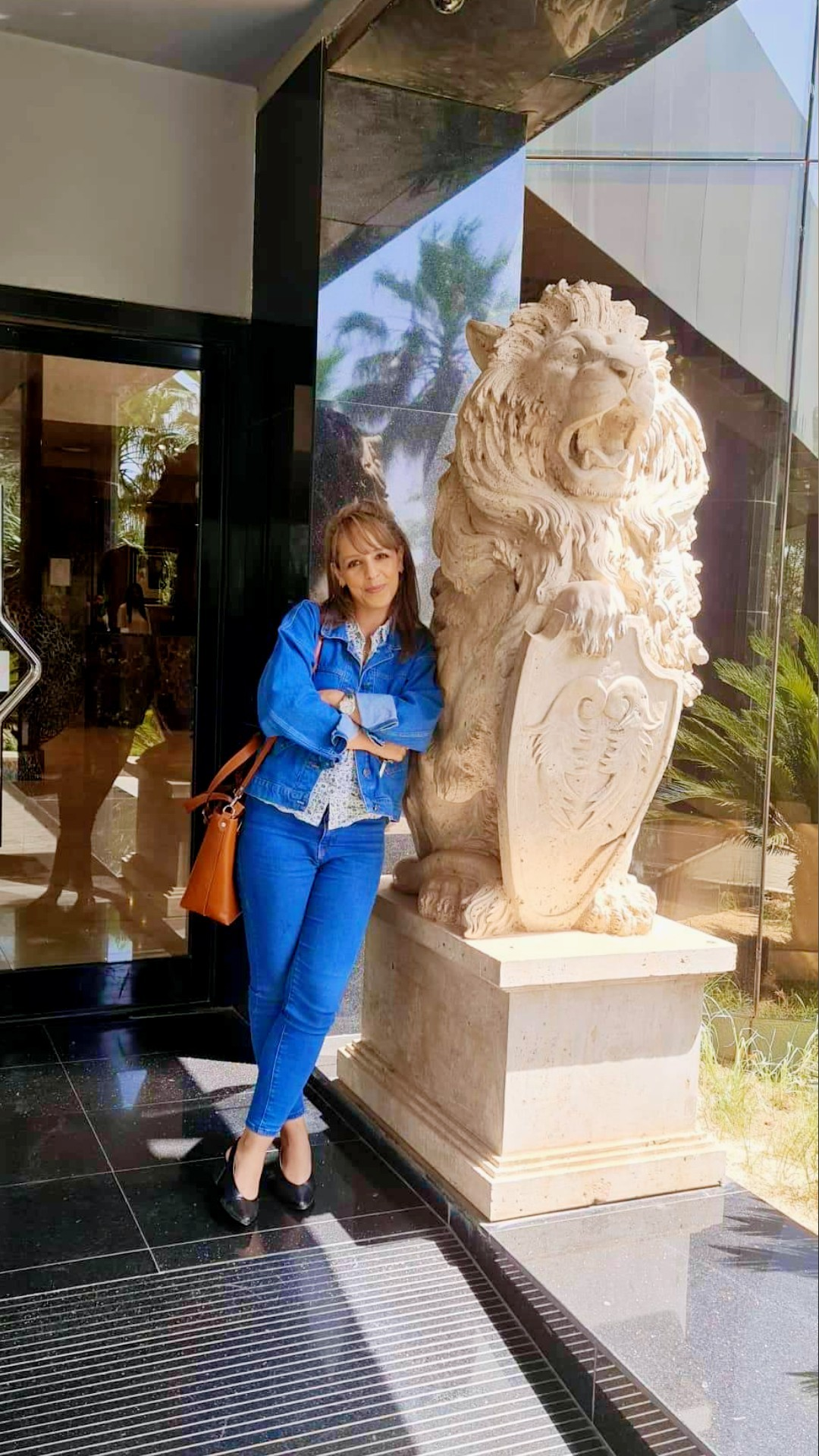
- Darwish in 2018
- Born: November 26, 1991 (age 34); Algiers, Algeria
- Occupation: Writer
- Writing career
- Language: Arabic
- Notable works: Women with out Memory (2015); An other "You" (2017)

Signature
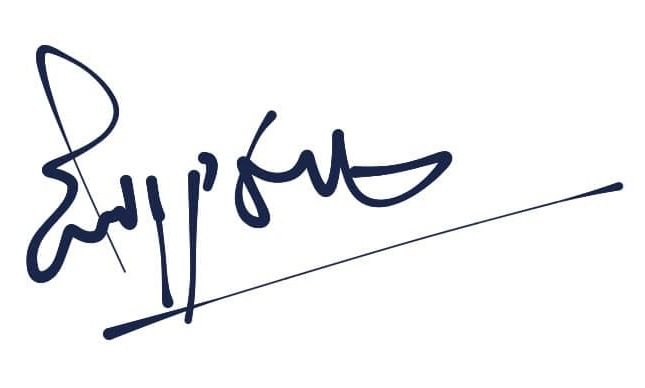

Houda Darwish (Arabic: هدى درويش) is an Algerian novelist, poet, writer, and women's rights activist. According to Abdel Madjid Djaber, a Palestinian critic and academician, she is a "charming lady of Algerian literature.".

== Personal life ==
Born in West Algeria on November 26, 1991, Houda Darwish lived with two parents working as teachers, the father an Arabic teacher, the mother a French teacher. Because of her family situation, she was opened up to a wide variety of cultures and a mix between the Arabic and French literature. She pursued her medicinal studies between French and Algerian university, currently as a pediatrician and neonatologist.

== Career ==
At the age of sixteen, once she settled down in Cairo, Darwish presented her first novel titled "Amal...A Love Looking for a Homeland" (In Arabic: آمال... حب يبحث عن وطن). It was written in a poetic style with political bravado. It talked about a journey of a Palestinian musician between the roads of politics, espionage, and exile.

Publishing works on a range of controversial issues, Darwish is well known by being literary affected by Jubran Khalil Jubran, Nizar Qabbani, and Mahmoud Darwish (supposedly, the latter man is the reason she chose Darwish as a last name for herself).

Huda Darwish continues her success by publishing sequels. Justifying her transition between poetry and prose, the ex editor-in-chief of Rose al-Yūsuf, Essam Abdel-Aziz, said "Houda Darwish is a creative woman whose writing made us come back to the belle epoque."

== Literature ==
=== Stories ===
- آمال.. حب يبحث عن وطن (Hopes ... Love Looking for a Homeland)
- Amour en Quete sa Nation
- خلود الياسمين (The Immortality of Jasmine)
- نساء بلا ذاكرة (Women Without Memory)

=== Poetry ===
- لك وحدك ("Only For You")
