= Huda Kattan =

Iraqi-American makeup artist and blogger (born 1983)

Huda Kattan هدى قطان
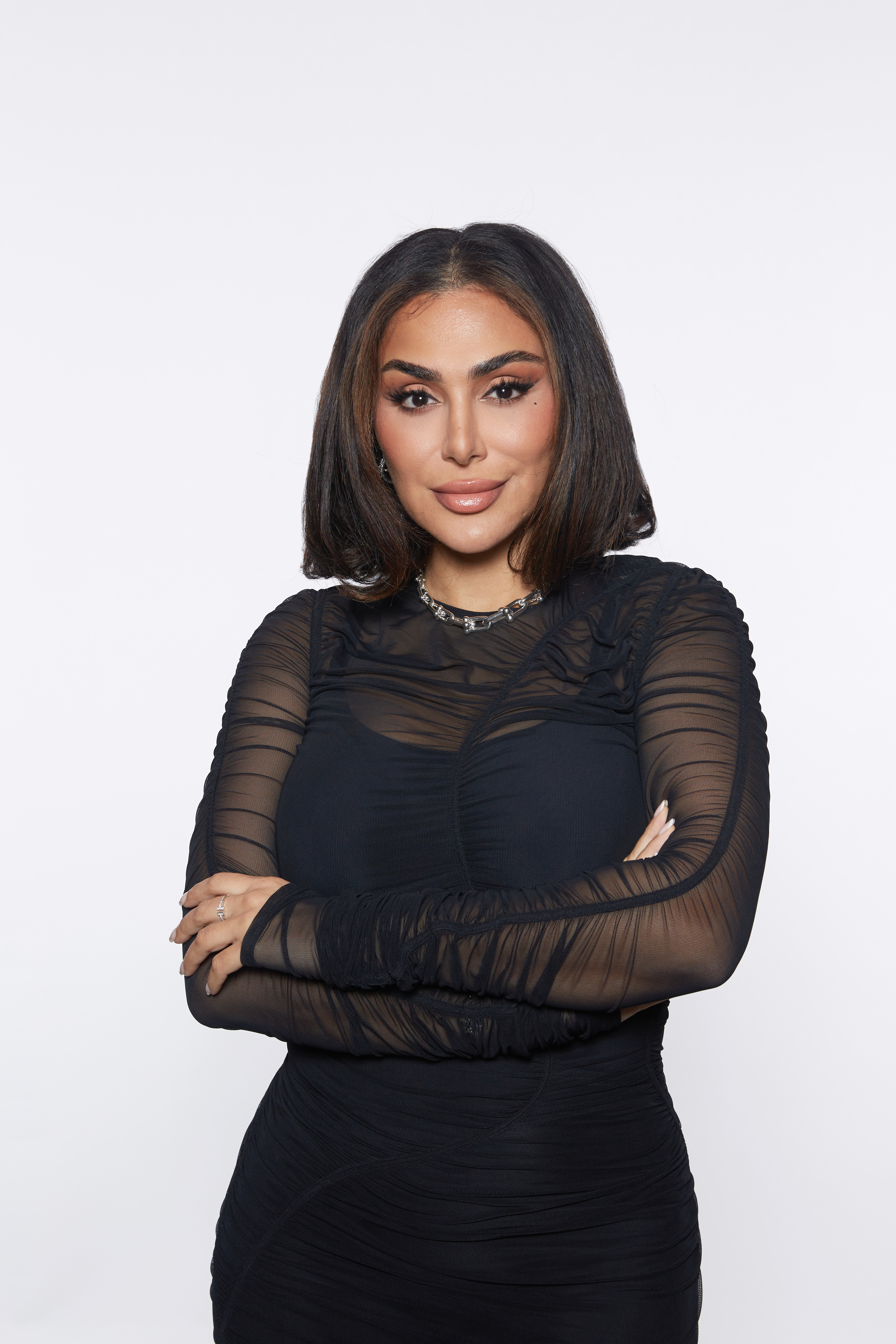
- Kattan in 2024
- Born: Huda Heidi Kattan; October 2, 1983 (age 43); Oklahoma City, Oklahoma, U.S.
- Education: University of Michigan–Dearborn
- Occupations: Makeup artist; beauty blogger; entrepreneur
- Years active: 2010–present
- Spouse: Christopher Goncalo (m. 2009)
- Children: 1
- Relatives: Mona Kattan (sister)
- Website: hudabeauty.com

Huda Heidi Kattan (Arabic: هدى قطان, romanized: Hudā Qaṭṭān; born October 2, 1983) is an American makeup artist, beauty blogger and entrepreneur. Her parents were born in Iraq, she was born and raised in the United States, and she moved to Dubai in the United Arab Emirates in 2008. She is the founder of the cosmetics line Huda Beauty, which is based in Dubai.

== Early life ==
Huda Kattan was born on October 2, 1983, in Oklahoma City, Oklahoma. She was one of four children. Kattan is a practicing Muslim; she does not wear a hijab, but claims that she prays five times a day.

Kattan's parents had both immigrated to the United States from Iraq. The family later moved to Cookeville, Tennessee, and then to Dartmouth, Massachusetts. There she attended Dartmouth High School, from which she graduated in 2001. In 2008, she graduated from the University of Michigan–Dearborn where she majored in business administration/finance, and during which time she met her future husband, Christopher Goncalo, who is of Portuguese heritage.

In 2008, she and her husband moved to Dubai in the United Arab Emirates, where her father had moved two years prior as he had a job opportunity as a professor in the emirate. In Dubai, Kattan worked in recruitment at Robert Half Recruitment. After not having much success at work, Kattan lost her recruiting job. She then took a job in public relations, but quit it two weeks later.

== Career ==
Kattan then moved to Los Angeles, where she studied makeup. Among her clients were celebrities such as Eva Longoria and Nicole Richie.

Kattan then returned to Dubai where she became employed by Revlon as a makeup artist. In April 2010, upon the advice of one of her sisters, Kattan started a beauty-related WordPress blog which she named "Huda Beauty" on which she would post makeup tutorials and tips.

In 2013, Kattan founded a cosmetics line which, like her blog, is also called "Huda Beauty." Her first product, a series of false eyelashes, was released through Sephora. The Huda Beauty label achieved success with the sales of the false eyelashes, which were worn by Kim Kardashian. Huda's company, which is based in Dubai, later began to offer other beauty products, including eye shadow palettes, liquid lipsticks, lip liners, highlighter palettes, foundations, concealers, baking powders and liquid eyeshadows.

In 2017, Kattan was described as "a Kim Kardashian West of the beauty influencer economy". Kattan has reportedly influenced entire brand and product line sales in the region. Huda Beauty achieved popularity on Instagram, attaining 56 million followers as of 2026.

In 2018 and 2019, Kattan starred in her own original Facebook Watch reality series entitled Huda Boss, alongside her family.

In July 2022, a California federal court approved a $1.93 million class-action settlement, and $1.2 million in attorneys' fees, against Huda Beauty to resolve allegations that its "Neon Obsessions" makeup palettes caused "rashes, painful eye irritation, and skin inflammations and discolourations”. The lawsuit alleged that the company unlawfully marketed the makeup palettes for use in the immediate eye area, despite containing fluorescent color additives that were not approved by the Food and Drug Administration for use near the eyes because of potential eye irritation and staining.

== Philanthropy and activism ==
Through Huda Beauty, Kattan has participated in various philanthropic efforts. In June 2020, Kattan announced that Huda Beauty will donate $500,000 to the NAACP Legal Defense Fund.

In 2021, Kattan participated in a Dubai campaign to provide food and said that she donated one million meals through her cosmetics company Huda Beauty. In 2021, Kattan and Huda Beauty started a petition, which by 2026 had 5,000 signatures, for her customers to urge beauty brands to disclose when they've retouched or edited their images or videos, to help dismantle "toxic" social media beauty standards. That year, through her beauty brand, she has also stood in solidarity with the Asian American community, and supported Médecins Sans Frontières (Doctors Without Borders) and initiatives such as a Ramadan food drive. Kattan has also used social media to support Palestine in the Israeli–Palestinian conflict. In May 2021, Kattan and her company, Huda Beauty donated $100,000 to Help India Breathe, a COVID-19 relief fundraiser launched by influencer podcaster Jay Shetty who says that he is a former Hare Krishna monk and his wife, Radhika Devlukia-Shetty. In November 2023, Kattan announced that she would donate $1 million to two humanitarian organizations working in Gaza, Doctors Without Borders and Human Appeal.

== Personal life ==
Kattan and her husband got married in June 2009, and had a child in 2011.

One of Kattan's sisters, Mona, is her business partner; another sister, Alya, manages Kattan's social media. In addition to being the co-founder of Huda Beauty, Mona is the founder of Kayali fragrances. Huda is the face of the makeup brand while Mona focuses on her perfume brand.

Kattan and actress Eva Longoria were friends for over 10 years. However, in 2024, they had a falling out over Kattan's continued Palestinian sympathies amid the Gaza war, with Kattan claiming that people like Longoria had to get educated.

== Controversies ==
=== 2025 antisemitic conspiracy video ===
In July 2025, Kattan posted a video on her personal TikTok account promoting several debunked antisemitic conspiracy theories regarding the Jewish people and Israel. In the video, Kattan stated that Israel was behind World War I, World War II, the September 11 attacks, and the October 7 attacks. Kattan also claimed that Israel "protects paedophiles."

TikTok removed Kattan's video, because it contained harmful misinformation and hate speech, Civil rights organizations sharply criticized the remarks. Jonathan Greenblatt, CEO of the Anti-Defamation League (ADL), described Kattan's claims as "irresponsible and dangerous," stating that they echoed "some of the oldest and most pernicious antisemitic tropes."

Following calls for a consumer boycott, French cosmetics retailer Sephora released a statement emphasizing that promoting hate, harassment, or misinformation did not align with its values, and announced an internal review of its relationship with Kattan's Huda Beauty. As an initial measure, Sephora dropped Kattan from an upcoming United States fall promotional campaign. Online sales for eight of Huda Beauty's 10 bestselling products on Sephora's U.S. website declined during the first week of August 2025 following the controversy.

=== 2026 pro-Iranian-regime video ===
In January 2026, Kattan faced a second wave of public criticism and renewed boycott campaigns after she posted a separate video on social media. That month, amid the 2025–2026 Iranian protests and the 2026 Iran massacres, Kattan faced backlash after she posted a pro-Iranian regime propaganda video showing pro-Islamic Republic protesters burning images of the Iranian opposition.

This triggered viral social media trends under the "Boycott Huda Beauty" banner, featuring prominent influencers and consumers filming themselves smashing, burning, or throwing away Huda Beauty cosmetics in protest. This led to a boycott campaign against her products. The controversies collectively prompted direct consumer pressure on major global beauty retailers, such as Sephora, to sever commercial ties and pull the brand's inventory from retail shelves.

== Awards ==
She was ranked #1 on the "2017 Influencer Instagram Rich List", as she earned $18,000 for each post of sponsored content. Also in 2017, she was declared one of the "ten most powerful influencers in the world of beauty" by Forbes magazine, and one of "The 25 Most Influential People on the Internet" by Time magazine. In 2020, Kattan was listed on Fortune's 40 Under 40 In 2023, Kattan was named in the BBC's 100 Women list.
