= Syed A. Hoda =

Syed Amir Fazal Hoda is a professor of pathology at the Weill Medical College of Cornell University, and an Attending Pathologist at the New York Presbyterian Hospital. Hoda is a surgical pathologist with a particular interest in diagnostic breast pathology.
