= Huda Polica =

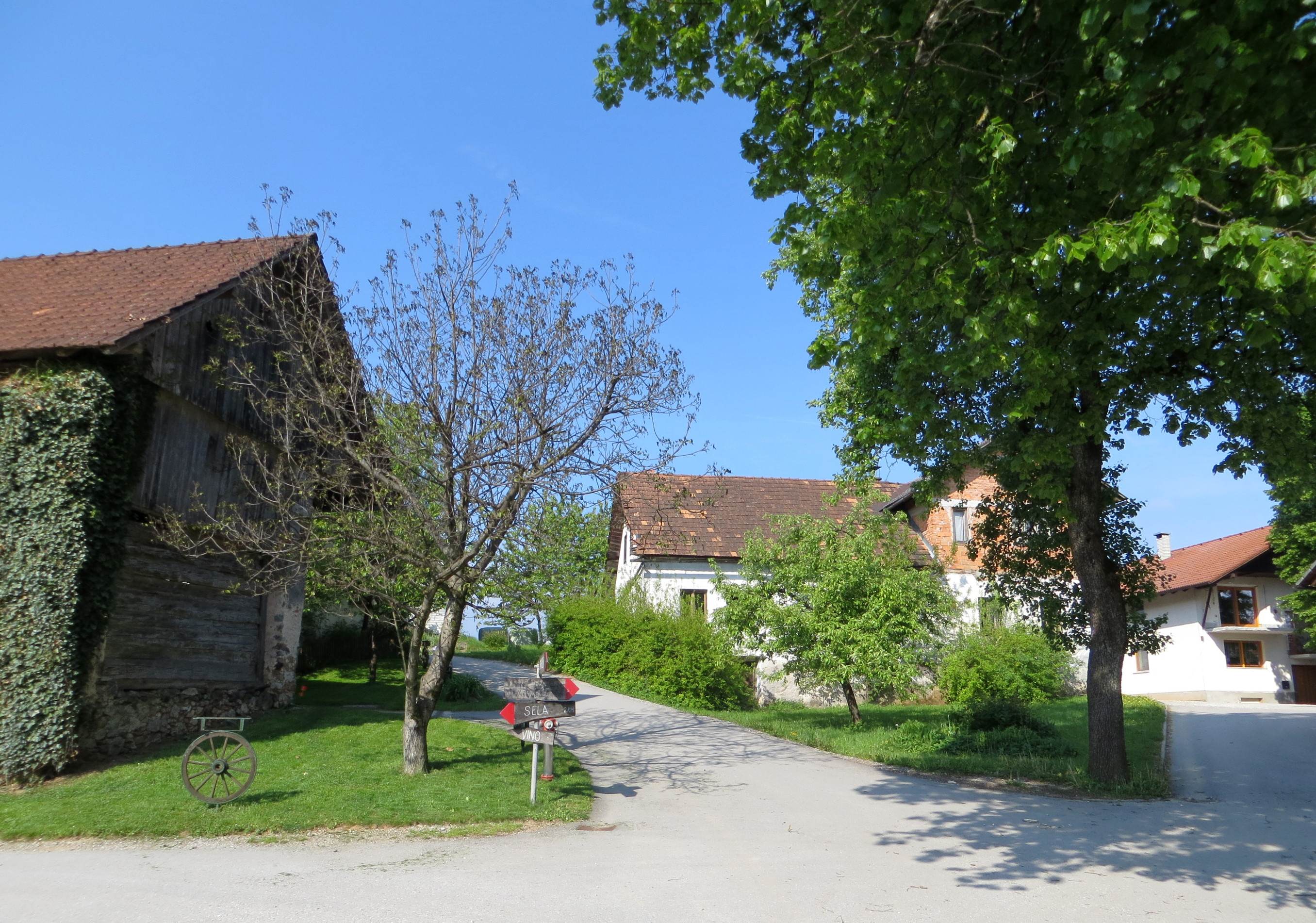

- Location in Slovenia
- Coordinates: 45°57′40.53″N 14°36′17.79″E
- Country: Slovenia
- Traditional region: Lower Carniola
- Statistical region: Central Slovenia
- Municipality: Grosuplje

Area
  - Total: 1.32 km^{2} (0.51 sq mi)
- Elevation: 367.9 m (1,207 ft)

Population (2002)
  - Total: 25

Huda Polica (pronounced [ˈxuːda pɔˈliːtsa]) is a small settlement in the hills south of Šmarje–Sap in the Municipality of Grosuplje in central Slovenia. The area is part of the historical region of Lower Carniola. The municipality is now included in the Central Slovenia Statistical Region.
