= Qamar-ul Huda =

American religious scholar

Qamar-ul Huda is an American religious scholar.

== Professional ==
Huda joined Boston College as an assistant professor in 1998. In 2002 he published a revised version of the dissertation with Routledge Sufi Series entitled "Striving for Divine Union: Spiritual Exercises for the Suhrwardi Sufis" (London and New York).

He wrote a personal account of the new demands for his expertise following the attack on the USA on September 11, 2001. He was one of three American professors of religion who drafted letters to be submitted to Murat Kurnaz's Administrative Review Board.

Huda joined the United States Institute of Peace (USIP) Program for Religion and Peacemaking as a senior program officer in the Department of Religion and Peacebuilding based in Washington, DC. At USIP's Academy for Conflict Analysis and Conflict Transformation he was the director of the countering violent extremism program to supervise curriculum development and training.

The United States Department of State (State Department) hired Huda to be seconded as subject matter expert to build up Hedayah: The International Centre of Excellence for Countering Violent Extremism based in Abu Dhabi, United Arab Emirates, where he served as the first American director of a Program.

In 2012, U.S. Secretary of State, John Kerry, established a new office called The Religion and Global Affairs (RGA) to demonstrate the critical importance the role of religion plays in foreign affairs. In this office at the State Department, Huda served as a senior policy advisor in the RGA Office. Later in 2017, Huda with several colleagues co-founded the Center for Global Policy, a non-partisan independent policy think tank focused on U.S. foreign policy and national security and the geopolitics of Muslim majority countries in the Middle East, South Asia, Central Asia and Southeast Asia. He was the founding director for the Program on Conflict, Stabilization and Development where the program focused on development issues, moving from conflict toward peace processes, conflict management, and new metrics to understand stabilization. For the Center for Global Policy, Huda authored over a dozen policy briefs and a policy report entitled "A Critique of Countering Violent Extremism Programs in Pakistan." (August, 2020). Based on this study, the Near East and South Asia Center Center for Strategic Studies (NESA) at the National Defense University (NDU) in Washington, DC, conducted an interview on the core findings of the countering violent extremism policy report, and on religion, diplomacy and global affairs.

== Publications ==
=== Books ===
- Striving for Divine Union: Spiritual Exercises for the Suhrawardi Sufis. Routledge Curzon Press. 2003.

==== Translations ====
- Turkish translation of Striving for Divine Union by Tahir Uluq (Istanbul: Insan Press Ltd, November, 2007).
- Peacebuilding and Conflict Resolution in Islam - a Peace Textbook for students, in Urdu, Islam mein Qiyam Aman aur Hal-e Tanaza 'at, (Islamabad: Markaz muthalat Aman, 2009) Second edition 2018. English translation by Qamar-ul Huda.

==== As editor ====
- Crescent and Dove: Peace and Conflict Resolution in Islam. Washington, DC: United States Institute of Peace Press. 2011.
  - Urdu translation: Hillal aur Farhota: Aman wa Tanza – e hal Islam Mein. Islamabad: Emel Publications. 2017.

=== Chapters ===
- Zelizer, Craig, ed. (2014). "Religion and Peacemaking". Integrated Peacebuilding: Innovative Approaches to Transforming Conflict. Westwood Press.; chapter authored with Katherine Marshall
- Kamali, Mohammad Hashim; Crow, Karim D.; Akhmetova, Elmira, eds. (2017). "Transforming 'Ulama: Peace-building Practices with Strategic Interfaith and Intercultural Dialogues". Islam and Diplomacy: The Quest for Human Security. Malaysia: IAIS. pp. 181–201.
- Rippin, Andrew; Mohammed, Khaleel, eds. (2008). "Qur'an and Hadith in the School of al-Suhrawardi". Coming to Terms with the Qur'an. New Jersey: Islamic Publications International. pp. 159–177.
- Pope, Stephen; Hefling, Charles, eds. (2002). "The Challenges of Dominus Iesus to Muslim-Christian Relations". Sic et Non: Essays on Dominus Iesus. New York: Orbis Books. pp. 150–156.
- Abu El Fadl, Khalid, ed. (2002). "Multiple Authorities in Islam". The Place of Tolerance in Islam. Boston: Beacon Press. pp. 56–62.

=== Articles in encyclopedias and dictionaries ===
- Guest articles published for Medieval Islamic Civilization: An Encyclopedia, Josef W. Meri, editor. Entries are: "Sufism in South Asia" and "Shihab al-din 'Umar al- Suhrawardi" (New York: Routledge, October, 2005).
- Guest articles published for The Encyclopedia of Holy Persons, Phyllis Jenkins, editor. Entries are: Abdu'l Qadir Jilani; Baha' ud-din Naqshband; Shihab ud-din Abu Hafs 'Umar al- Suhrawardi; Baha' ud-din Zakariyya; Rukn ud-din Abul Fath; Lal Shahbaz Qalandar; Amir Khusrau; Shah Waliullah; Bullhe Shah; Shah Abdul Latif; and, Sharafuddin Maneri.(Santa Barbara, CA: ABC-Clio Publications, April, 2004).
- Guest articles published for Encyclopedia of Islam and the Muslim World, Richard C. Martin, editor. Entries are: Muhammad al-Ghazali, Organization of the Islamic Conference, and Orientalism. (New York: Macmillian Publishing, 2003).
- Guest articles published for The Oxford Dictionary of Islam, John Esposito, editor. Entries are: insan al-Kamil, Iqrar, Mathnawi, Misbahah, and Muqaddim. (New York: Oxford University Press, 2003).
- Guest articles published in Religions of the World: A Comprehensive Encyclopedia of Beliefs and Practices, Melton, J. Gordon and Marin Baumann, eds. 4 vols. Entries are Sufism, Shadhiliyya, Qadiriyya, Rifaiyya, Mevlevi, and Suhrawardiyya. (Santa Barbara, CA: ABC-Clio Publications, 2002).
- McAuliffe, Jane, ed. (2000). "Anatomy in the Qur'an". The Encyclopaedia of the Qur'an. Vol. 1. Leiden: Brill Publications.

== Honors and academic awards ==
- Selected in The Muslim 500: The World’s Most Influential Muslims in 2016, 2017, 2018, 2019, and 2020., published by The Royal Islamic Strategic Centre, Jordan
