= Shahrak-e Alam ol Hoda =

Shahrak-e Alam ol Hoda شهرك علم الهدي
- Village
- Location within Iran
- Coordinates: 32°00′55″N 48°50′40″E
- Country: Iran
- Province: Khuzestan
- County: Shushtar
- Bakhsh: Central
- Rural District: Miyan Ab-e Shomali

Population (2006)
  - Total: 3,108
- Time zone: UTC+3:30 (IRST)
  - Summer (DST): UTC+4:30 (IRDT)

Shahrak-e Alam ol Hoda (Persian: شهرك علم الهدي, also Romanized as Shahrak-e ‘Alam ol Hodá) is a village in Miyan Ab-e Shomali Rural District, in the Central District of Shushtar County, Khuzestan Province, Iran. At the 2006 census, its population was 3,108, in 555 families.
