= Kadampuzha =

- Small town
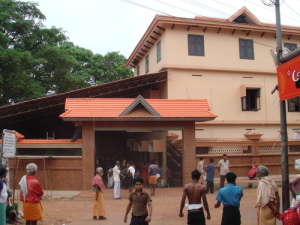
- Kadampuzha Temple
- Interactive map of Kadampuzha
- Coordinates: 10°56′0″N 76°2′0″E
- Country: India
- State: Kerala
- District: Malappuram

Government
  - Body: Marakara Panchayat

Languages
  - Official: Malayalam, English
- Time zone: UTC+5:30 (IST)
- Postal code: 676553
- Vehicle registration: KL-55
- Lok Sabha constituency: Ponnani
- Nearest city: Malappuram

Kadampuzha is a small town and a pilgrimage centre in Malappuram district of Kerala situated near the Thrissur-Calicut national highway.

== Kadampuzha Temple ==
This village is known for Kadampuzha Devi Temple believed to have been consecrated by Adi Shankara . Situated in Marakkara grama Panchayath, Kadampuzha is 2.7 km away from Vettichira on the Thrissur-Calicut national highway.

== Etymology ==
"Kadampuzha" got its name originated from "Kadan"(Forest dweller), "Ambu"(Arrow), "Azha"(Stream). The deity of the temple is goddess VanaDurga.

== Festivals ==
Though the temple is famous all over the state of Kerala, there is no major festival associated with the temple. on Thrikkarthika day(Karthika Day of Malayalam month Vrishchikam), usually in November/December the birthday of goddess is celebrated in a huge manner.

== Culture ==
Kadampuzha village is a moderately Muslim populated area. Hindus are exist in comparatively lesser numbers. So the culture of the locality is based upon heterogeneous manner.

== Transportation ==
Kadampuzha village connects to other parts of India through Valanchery town. National highway No.66 passes through Valanchery and the northern stretch connects to Bangalore and Mumbai. The southern stretch connects to Cochin and Trivandrum. State Highway No.28 starts from Nilambur and connects to Ooty, Mysore and Bangalore through Highways.12,29 and 181. National Highway No.966 connects to Palakkad and Coimbatore. The nearest airport is at Kozhikode. The nearest major railway stations are in Kuttippuram (17KM) and Tirur (18KM). The town 'vettichira' 2.7 km away from kadampuzha help to get bus to kozhikkode, kannur and also to south districts of malappuram such as Trissur, ernamkulam.....etc

== See also ==
- Kadampuzha Devi Temple
