= Huda Otoum =

Jordanian politician (born 1963)

Huda Etoom, (Arabic:هدى العتوم born in 1963) is a Jordanian politician, and member of Jordan's Muslim Brotherhood, and its political arm the Islamic Action Front party.

== Life ==
Huda Etoom is a Jordanian politician and member of Jordan's Muslim Brotherhood.

She won the women quota in the Jerash district in the 2016 Jordanian general elections, becoming member of the House of Representatives and Parliament.

She ran in the 2020 parliamentary elections under the National Alliance for Reform party, but she did not win.

During a vote of confidence session on 17 July 2018 for Omar Razzaz's newly appointed cabinet, She also demanded greater attention from the government to Islamic values and called on the government to ban pornographic websites.

== Qualifications ==
- Bachelor's in Public Administration, Yarmouk University, 1987.
- Master's in Public Administration, University of Jordan, 1994.

== Practical Experiences ==
- Secondary teacher 1991 till 2003.
- High school principal from 2003 till 2015.
- Has the Muslim seat in the Parliament.
