= Houda =

Houda is a given name and a surname of Arabic origin. Notable people with these names include:

== Given name ==
- Houda Ben Daya (born 1979), Tunisian judoka
- Houda Benyamina (born 1980), French director and screenwriter
- Houda Darwish (born 1991), Algerian novelist, poet, writer, and women's rights activist
- Houda Echouafni, British actress
- Houda-Imane Faraoun (born 1979), Algerian scientist
- Houda Miled (born 1987), Tunisian judoka
- Houda Nonoo (born 1964), Bahraini Ambassador

== Surname ==
- Doug Houda (born 1966), Canadian hockey player
- Fatima Houda-Pepin (born 1951), Canadian politician
- Nour El Houda Bouregua (born 1992), Algerian volleyball player
- Nour El-Houda Ettaieb (born 1996), Tunisian rower
- Sayed Houda (1900–1985), Egyptian footballer
- Simona Houda-Šaturová, Slovak classical soprano

== See also ==
- Hoda (given name)
- Huda (given name)
- Hoda (surname)
- Huda (surname)
- Howdah
- Khuda, Persian word for "God"
