= Hoda Mahmoudi =

Political scientist and university teacher

- Occupation: Academic
- Title: Baha'i Chair for World Peace, University of Maryland

Academic background
- Education: PhD.
- Alma mater: University of Utah

Academic work
- Discipline: Sociology
- Main interests: systemic racism, women's movements, globalization
- Website: https://www.bahaichair.umd.edu/hoda-mahmoudi

Hoda Mahmoudi is an American academic and scholar, specializing in religion and peace studies. Since July 2012, she has held the Baha'i Chair for World Peace at the University of Maryland.

== Biography ==
According to Mahmoudi, she was born in Iran, and moved to Utah in the United States when she was ten years old. She attended the University of Utah, where she earned a Bachelor of Arts in psychology and a Masters in Educational Psychology. She then completed a PhD in sociology, also at the University of Utah.

Early in her academic career, she served as vice-president and dean at Mount Olivet College. She then taught sociology and served as dean at the College of Arts and Sciences at Northeastern Illinois University. In 2001, she began working at the Research Department at the Bahá’í World Centre in Haifa, Israel. She remained in this role until 2012, when she joined the faculty at the University of Maryland. She was appointed to the Baha'i Chair for World Peace, an endowed chair established in 1993.

One significant focus of her research has been systemic racism. She co-edited a volume entitled Systemic Racism in America: Sociological Theory, Educational Inequality and Social Change, which was published in 2022. Among other topics, she has written on the movement for women's rights in Iran.

== Awards ==
in 2021, she was awarded the Rev. Clark Lobenstine Interfaith Bridge Builder Award, given annually by the Interfaith Council of Metropolitan Washington.

== Works ==
- Mahmoudi, Hoda and Steven Mintz, eds. Children and Globalization: Multidisciplinary Perspectives (2019). ISBN 978-1-03-209317-8
- Mahmoudi, Hoda and Michael L. Penn, eds. Interdisciplinary Perspectives on Human Dignity and Human Rights ISBN 978-1-78973-822-3 ProQuest 2330073119
- Mahmoudi, Hoda and Rashawn Ray, eds. Systemic Racism in America: Sociological Theory, Education Inequality, and Social Change. ISBN 978-1-03-212494-0
