= Shahrak-e Benat ol Hoda =

Shahrak-e Benat ol Hoda شهرك بنت الهدئ
- Village
- Location within Iran
- Coordinates: 32°04′34″N 49°34′57″E
- Country: Iran
- Province: Khuzestan
- County: Andika
- Bakhsh: Abezhdan
- Rural District: Kushk

Population (2006)
  - Total: 230
- Time zone: UTC+3:30 (IRST)
  - Summer (DST): UTC+4:30 (IRDT)

Shahrak-e Benat ol Hoda (Persian: شهرك بنت الهدئ, also Romanized as Shahrak-e Benat ol Hodá; also known as Kūy-e Bent ol Hodá) is a village in Kushk Rural District, Abezhdan District, Andika County, Khuzestan Province, Iran. At the 2006 census, its population was 230, in 55 families.
