= Qubaybat Abu al-Huda =

Qubaybat Abu al-Huda قبيبات أبو الهدى
- Village
- Location in Syria
- Coordinates: 35°22′20″N 36°51′23″E
- Country: Syria
- Governorate: Hama
- District: Hama
- Subdistrict: Suran

Population (2004)
  - Total: 402
- Time zone: UTC+3 (AST)
- City Qrya Pcode: C3033

Qubaybat Abu al-Huda (Arabic: قبيبات أبو الهدى; also spelled Qbeibat) is a village in central Syria, administratively part of the Suran Subdistrict of the Hama District. According to the Syria Central Bureau of Statistics (CBS), Qubaybat Abu al-Huda had a population of 402 in the 2004 census. Its inhabitants are Alawites.

== History ==
In the late 19th century or first decade of the 20th century, during Ottoman rule (1517–1918), Qubaybat was sold by the tribe of Bani Khalid, semi-nomadic Bedouins of central Syria, to the prominent Shishakli family of Hama. The Shishakli family sold it to another prominent Hama family, the Kaylani, in 1905. The inhabitants were Alawite tenant farmers who were settled in the village by its urban landlords to cultivate its lands in the 1920s or early 1930s.

== Bibliography ==
- Comité de l'Asie française (April 1933). "Notes sur la propriété foncière dans le Syrie centrale (Notes on Landownership in Central Syria)". Bulletin du Comité de l'Asie française (in French). 33 (309). Comité de l'Asie française: 130–136.
