= Huda Lutfi =

Egyptian artist and historian (born 1948)

- Born: Cairo
- Citizenship: Egypt
- Education: The American University
- Occupation: visual artist

Huda Lutfi (Arabic: هدى لطفي) is a visual artist and cultural historian from Cairo, Egypt. Lutfi's works include paintings, collages, and installations that reflect a diverse style including pharaonic, Coptic, Western, Islamic, and contemporary international.

== Early life and academic career ==
Lutfi was born in Cairo in 1948. She earned a Ph.D. in Islamic Culture and History from McGill University in 1983. Lutfi joined the facility of the Department of Arab and Islamic Civilization at The American University in Cairo in 1983 and retired in 2010.

== Artistic work ==
Lutfi is a self-taught artist whose works are inspired by Cairo and reflect elements of popular culture and political symbols. She lists Effat Nagy, Mona Hatoum, Hieronymus Bosch, Amal Kenawy, Richard Tuttle, and Ghada Amer as influences, among others.

She works with assemblage painting, sculpture, installation, collage, and video. Her work connects modernity and tradition with themes and influence from Coptic, Arab, Indian, European, and Pharaonic images. Her use of texts in Coptic and Arabic have been a point of conversation in Egypt. Her art also centers womanhood within both Western and Arab cultures as a common theme.

Her art has been featured in multiple Townhouse Gallery solo exhibitions such as Found in Cairo (2003) and Cut and Paste (2013). Found in Cairo uses found materials to explore the changing cultural landscape of Cairo. Cut and Paste similarly archives found materials, but serves as a response to the 25 of January Revolution. The 2011 uprisings shook Egypt’s cultural and political landscape. Lutfi partially documents this rapidly changing period in Egypt’s history. Lutfi has also been featured in the significant LACMA group exhibition Women Defining Women.

== Censorship ==
Lutfi’s Exhibition Found in Cairo was publicly advertised using images of shoe molds that Lutfi cleansed and painted with a Sufi inscription. Egyptian officials had a “friendly interrogation” with Lutfi. They did not allow these images to be presented to the public as they believed Lutfi would be in danger. Her inscriptions were interpreted by an anynonymous civilian as disparaging an excerpt from the Quran on shoes. Lutfi explained her intention was to cleanse the shoe moulds (which are not actual shoes) in a meditative exercise. They were allowed to be shown in private and controversial Townhouse Gallery.

The same piece was also retracted from a showing of Found in Cairo in Bahrain. Airport officials in the Cairo international airport detained the shipping officials and the piece was subject to inspection by an expert. The investigation was exacerbated by accusations of Coptic conspiracy as the shipping officials were Coptic. Her art was never returned and she faced scrutiny for years despite explaining her intention did not line up with the literalist interpretation.

== Exhibitions ==
Selected solo exhibitions include Women and Memory, American University in Cairo (1996); Cut and Paste, Townhouse Gallery, Cairo (2013); Magnetic Bodies: Imagining the Urban, The Third Line, Dubai (2016); Still, The Third Line, Dubai (2018); When Dreams Call for Silence, Tahrir Cultural Center, Cairo (2019); Healing Devices, Dallas Museum of Art, Texas (2021); and Our Black Thread, Gypsum Gallery, Cairo (2021).

Lutfi has also participated in various group exhibitions, including Women Defining Women in Contemporary Art of the Middle East and Beyond, Los Angeles County Museum of Art, Los Angeles (2023); History Leads to Twisted Mountains, ARDforart, Cairo (2022); Reflections contemporary art of the Middle East and North Africa, The British Museum, London (2021); There is Fiction in The Space Between, The Third Line, Dubai (2020); Occupational Hazards, Apexarts, New York (2019); Tell me the Story of all These Things, Villa Vassilieff, Paris (2017); The Turn: Art Practices in Post-Spring Societies, Kunstraum Niederoesterreich, Vienna (2016); La Bienal del Sur, Caracas (2015); Terms & Conditions, Singapore Art Museum, Singapore (2013); and My World Images, Festival For Contemporary Art, Copenhagen (2010).
