= Huda Boss =

- Genre: Reality
- Starring: Huda Kattan; Mona Kattan; Alya Kattan; Christopher Goncalo
- Country of origin: United States
- Original language: English
- No. of seasons: 1
- No. of episodes: 10

Production
- Executive producers: Pam Healey; Lisa Shannon; Huda Kattan; Mona Kattan; Esther Frank; John Paparazzo; David St. John
- Producer: Mari Haitkin
- Production locations: Dubai, United Arab Emirates; Los Angeles, California, USA
- Cinematography: Ali Moghadas; Lutz Geopfert
- Camera setup: Multi-camera
- Running time: 16–24 minutes
- Production company: Shed Media

Original release
- Network: Facebook Watch
- Release: June 12, 2018 – August 28, 2019

Huda Boss is an American reality series that premiered on June 12, 2018 on Facebook Watch. The show documents the personal and professional life of makeup artist and beauty blogger Huda Kattan and her family. On December 13, 2018, it was announced that the series had been renewed for a second season.

== Premise ==
Huda Boss follows "Huda Kattan, the 34-year-old beauty blogger turned CEO of beauty brand Huda Beauty, as she shares the good — and the bad — of what it takes to run a family-owned company. With the help of her sisters, Mona and Alya, as well as her husband Chris, Huda Kattan has grown Dubai-based Huda Beauty into an international cosmetics brand in five years."

== Cast ==
=== Main ===
- Huda Kattan, a makeup artist, beauty blogger, and the founder and CEO of Huda Beauty.
- Mona Kattan, the global president of Huda Beauty and owner of The Dollhouse beauty salon in Dubai.
- Alya Kattan, the Chief Instagram Officer of Huda Beauty.
- Christopher Goncalo, the COO of Huda Beauty and Huda Kattan's husband.

=== Recurring ===
- Dr. Ibrahim Kattan, a retired professor of industrial engineering and the father of Huda, Mona, Khalid, and Alya Kattan.
- Stacey Crossley, Huda's executive assistant.
- Nour Goncalo, the daughter of Huda and Christopher.
- Sabine Kühn, a marketing manager at Huda Beauty.
- Emaan Abbass, the product development manager at Huda Beauty.
- Noëlle El Saadany, a life coach and a friend of Mona's.
- Sina Shaker, Mona's executive assistant.
- Jamie Sherrill, a celebrity skin expert and the owner of Nurse Jamie, a line of beauty care products.
- Emily Booroff, the general manager of The Dollhouse beauty salon.
- Jen Atkin, a celebrity hair stylist.

=== Guest ===
- Jeremy Johnson, the co-owner of Too Faced Cosmetics. ("Million Dollar Mistake")
- Jerrod Blandino, the co-owner of Too Faced Cosmetics. ("Million Dollar Mistake")
- Shahd Batal, a beauty blogger. ("Million Dollar Mistake")
- Simone Harouche, a celebrity stylist. ("Not So Easy Bake Shoot")
- Adam Akehurst, the Assistant Retail Manager of the Middle East and North Africa at Huda Beauty and Stacey's fiancee. ("Beauty Battles")
- Samantha Wilkins, a public relations manager at Huda Beauty. ("Not Everyone is Coming Up Roses")
- Virginie Gervason Roche, Global Director of Marketing & Communication for Fragrance Ingredients at Firmenich. ("Not Everyone is Coming Up Roses")
- Siham Kattan, Huda, Mona, and Alya's mother and Ibrahim's wife. ("Birthday Blowout")
- George Goncalo, Christopher's father. ("Birthday Blowout")
- Carlota Goncalo, Christopher's mother. ("Birthday Blowout")
- Meg Storm, a writer for Us Weekly. ("The Big Apple Bake Off")
- Alaina Demopoulos, a writer for PopSugar. ("The Big Apple Bake Off")
- Jenna Rennert, a writer for Vogue. ("The Big Apple Bake Off")
- Carly Cardellino, the beauty director at Cosmopolitan. ("The Big Apple Bake Off")
- Farrah Moan, drag queen. ("How Does Huda Find Her Inner Ho?")
- Shea Couleé, drag queen. ("How Does Huda Find Her Inner Ho?")
- Violet Chachki, drag queen. ("How Does Huda Find Her Inner Ho?")

== Episodes ==
No. overall	No. in season	Title	Original release date
1	1	"One Big Huda Family"	June 12, 2018
2	2	"Million Dollar Mistake"	June 19, 2018
3	3	"Not So Easy Bake Shoot"	June 26, 2018
4	4	"Huda Baby?"	July 3, 2018
5	5	"Milan Rouge"	July 10, 2018
6	6	"Beauty Battles"	July 17, 2018
7	7	"Not Everyone is Coming Up Roses"	July 24, 2018
8	8	"Birthday Blowout"	July 31, 2018
9	9	"The Banana Slip"	August 7, 2018
10	10	"The Big Apple Bake Off"	August 14, 2018

== Production ==
On May 30, 2018, it was announced that Facebook had given the production a series order for a first season consisting of ten episodes. Executive producers were expected to include Pam Healey, Lisa Shannon, John Paparazzo, Esther Frank, Huda Kattan, and Mona Kattan. Production companies reported to be involved with the series included Shed Media. On December 13, 2018, it was announced that the series had been renewed for a second season.

== See also ==
- List of original programs distributed by Facebook Watch
