= Hoda Ali =

British activist

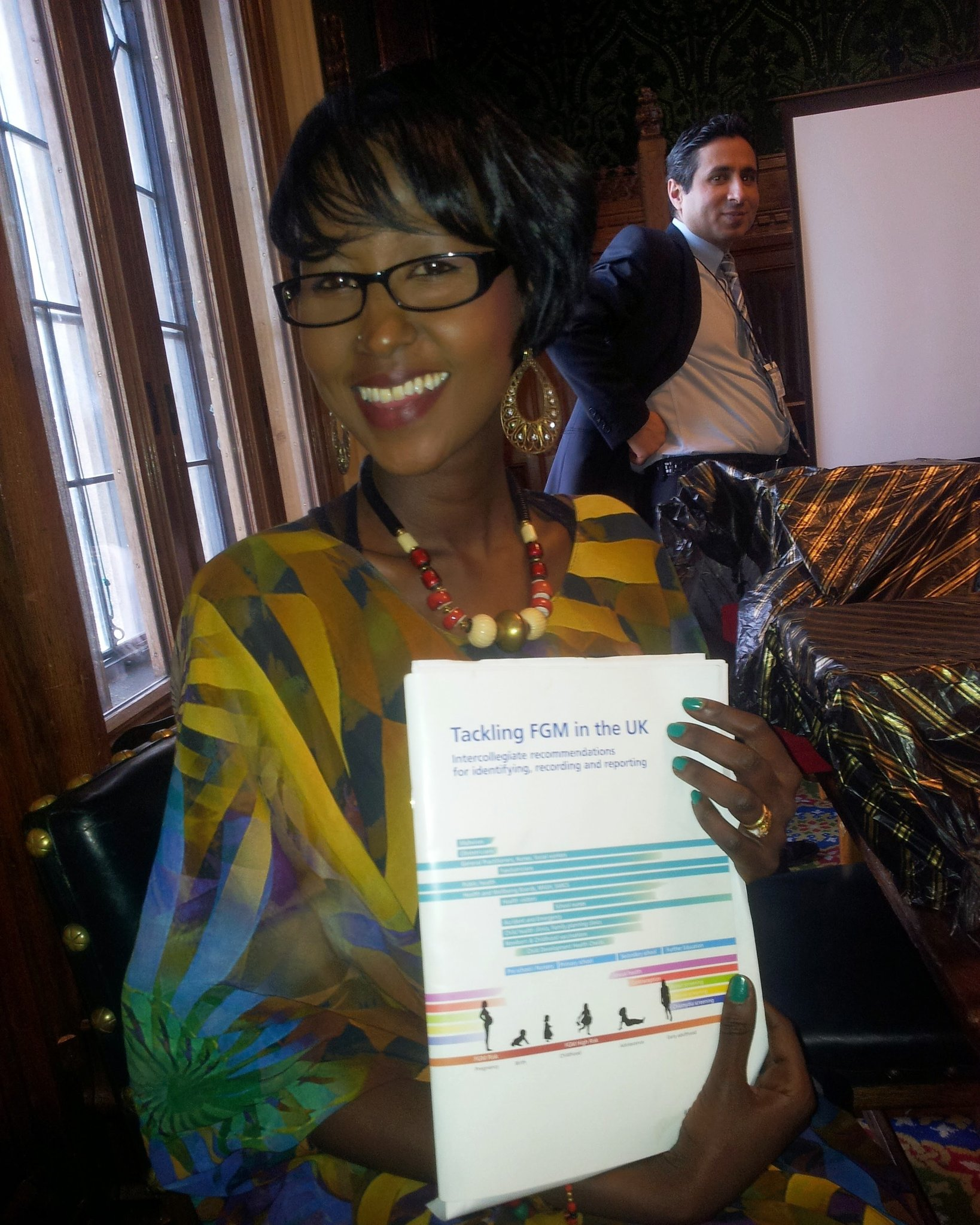
- Hoda Ali in May 2018

Hoda Ali is a nurse and human rights activist defending the rights of girls through working and campaigning to end female genital mutilation in the United Kingdom.

She works as a Community Outreach Project Manager for Safeguarding in Perivale Primary School, one of the first schools to set up an outreach programme on Female Genital Mutilation (FGM), a practice carried out on young girls normally up to age. Ali believes education is very important for preventing FGM.

== Life and work ==
Ali underwent FGM in Somalia at the age of 7. Complications she has endured since then include acute hospitalisations, inability to have children and early menopause. She now campaigns against female genital mutilation including that carried out by medical professionals.

In 2014 Ali co-founded the Vavengers, an FGM awareness-raising group. Their first event funded 'It happens here', a campaign of billboards in Islington and Ealing. This campaign won the CLIO Award for Advertiser of the Year in 2015, and Ali was delegated to New York to accept the prize on behalf of the advertising agency Ogilvy Mather.

In March 2018 she was nominated as an Amnesty International Human Rights Defender, and appears on the Suffragette Spirit Map.

She is a trustee for 28TooMany, a registered charity established "to undertake research and provide knowledge and tools to those working to end FGM in the countries in Africa where it is practised and across the diaspora worldwide".

== Media appearances ==
In 2013 Ali appeared in 'The Cruel Cut', a BAFTA-nominated Channel 4 documentary about female genital mutilation presented by psychotherapist and activist Leyla Hussein.

== See also ==
- Female genital mutilation
