= Hoda Abdel-Hamid =

War correspondent

Hoda Abdel Hamid (Arabic: هدى عبد الحميد) is a war correspondent with Al Jazeera.
