= Huda Tower =

Skyscraper in Addis Ababa, Ethiopia

General information
- Status: Completed
- Type: Commercial
- Location: Addis Ababa, Ethiopia
- Opening: 2004

Height
- Roof: 270 ft (82 m)

Technical details
- Floor count: 22

Design and construction
- Architect: Haile Gebrselassie

Huda Tower is a skyscraper located in Addis Ababa, Ethiopia. The 24 story building was completed in 2004, and houses the Ethiopia headquarters of the Sheikh Mohammed Hussein Al Amoudi-owned company MIDROC. Construction commenced in 1998, and ceased in 2004.

== See also ==
- Skyscraper design and construction
- List of tallest buildings in Africa
