= Meraj Khalid Noor =

Indian politician

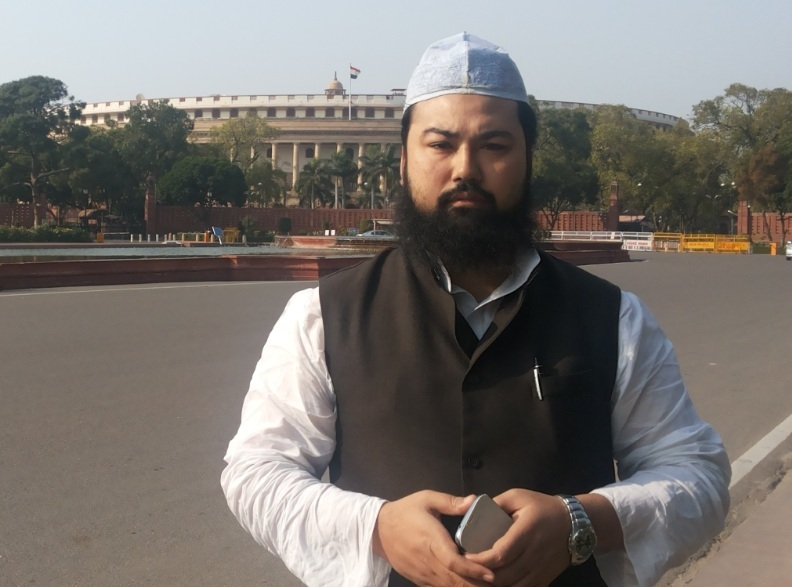
- Born: Bihar, India
- Known for: Resemblance to Osama bin Laden

Meraj Khalid Noor also known as Osama of Bihar is an Indian politician and communal harmony activist who is mainly known for his supposed resemblance to Osama bin Laden. He campaigned for the Lok Janshakti Party in the 2004 national elections, then for Rashtriya Janata Dal in the 2005 Bihar state elections. He wanted to run against Narendra Modi in the 2014 national elections but could not get a party to back him. He subsequently formed the Rashtriya Awami Movement, a new political party, but was dismissed as a candidate by the electoral authorities. He is now looking after his business and is no longer in politics. He is also the founder of Awami Insaf Morcha, which tried to form a third front in the 2015 Bihar Legislative Assembly election.

== Background ==
Meraj Khalid Noor's grandfather, Qazi Muzahidul Islam, was once president of the Muslim Personal Law Board. His father, Noor Ahmad, was politically linked to the socialist George Fernandes. Noor is often called "Bihar's Osama bin Laden" due to the similarity of his appearance to that of the former leader of Al-Qaeda. He is tall, has a long black beard, and always dresses in white robes and a turban, as did bin Laden. He has said that his resemblance to bin Laden is his main political asset. According to Noor, "I am neither a good speaker nor a leader with any support base". He also said he does not have the same leadership qualities as bin Laden.

== Political career ==
=== 2004 national elections ===
Noor asked the Lok Janshakti Party to sponsor him as a candidate in the 2004 election for the Lok Sabha, but he was rejected. However, he campaigned in Bihar for Ram Vilas Paswan of the LJP. Paswan took him along to election meetings, hoping to win support away from Lalu Prasad Yadav, leader of the state's Muslims. Paswan told a reporter that Noor's father was an old friend, and they had joined the old Socialist Party together. Asked about the bin Laden image, Paswan agreed that some Muslim youth looked up to bin Laden, but said most Muslims were against him.

=== 2005 Bihar state elections ===
Noor changed his political allegiance in September 2005, and in the 2005 elections for the Bihar Legislative Assembly campaigned for Lalu Prasad of the Rashtriya Janata Dal.

=== 2014 national elections ===
On 18 April 2014 Noor said he would run for election in the Varanasi constituency in the 2014 Indian general election, competing against Narendra Modi of the Bharatiya Janata Party (BJP). He said, "Modi is Ravan and is spreading hate across the nation. As a true Indian, I will not allow him to impure the water of the Ganga." In the 2014 elections, with bin Laden dead and strong competition from Modi, neither Paswan nor Lalu Prasad would have anything to do with him. Noor was not offered a ticket by any political party but was prepared to run as an independent. He launched his own party, Rashtriya Awami Movement (RAM) India. It sought harmony between Muslims and Hindus and hoped to stop "communal forces" from spreading their tentacles in the country.

There were 78 hopeful candidates for election in Varanasi, a very visible Lok Sabha seat due to the publicity to be gained from competing against Modi. Noor was among the 34 candidates who were rejected by the election's authorities.
