= Huda Abuarquob =

Palestinian peace activist and feminist

- هدى أبو عرقوب
- Born: 1970 (age 55–56); Jerusalem
- Education: Eastern Mennonite University

Huda Abuarquob (Arabic: هدى أبو عرقوب; born 1970) is a Palestinian peace activist and feminist, former educator, and a former regional director of Alliance for Middle East Peace (ALLMEP).

== Early life and education ==
Abuarquob was born in Jerusalem to a Communist and feminist mother, who taught English, and a Sufi-influenced father, who was a school principal. Her family placed immense importance on education; her paternal grandmother, who was illiterate, ensured her seven children were educated. Her family were also promoters of peace and nonviolence. Her maternal great-grandfather helped protect Jewish residents of Hebron during the 1929 Hebron massacre. When Abuarquob expressed interest in joining the First Intifada in the late 1980s, her mother discouraged her, telling her to read Tolstoy instead. She is the eldest of twelve children.

Abuarquob's family moved to Saudi Arabia for a few years during her childhood, before returning to the West Bank, where they settled in Bethlehem. There, her father taught at a Catholic school. The family later relocated again, to a village near Hebron.

== Career and education ==
Abuarquob first worked as a teacher in the West Bank, where she worked for 15 years for the Palestinian Ministry of Education. In 1997, she was part of a group of teachers who designed the first Palestinian educational curriculum. As part of the experience, she met with Israeli teachers; this marked the first time Abuarquob had met with Israeli civilians.

These educational encounters with Israelis would continue; a few years later, Abuarquob visited Boston to participate in a forum hosted by Boston College's Irish Institute, and met Israeli teachers also in attendance. She interned with the Irish Institute for the following three summers. Through these experiences, Abuarquob decided that education, and through it, engagement with 'the other', was key to peace efforts. After encountering Pedagogy of the Oppressed, by Paolo Freire, Abuarquob also began envisioning herself not as a victim, but simply as someone oppressed, and that “the responsibility of the oppressed [is] to liberate themselves, and thereby, liberate the oppressor as well.”.

Inspired to begin working as a peace activist, Abuarquob applied to the Fulbright Program. She was accepted, came to the United States in early 2004, where she studied at Eastern Mennonite University for a graduate degree in conflict transformation and peace studies, graduating in 2006. While at the university, Abuarquob was also able to reconnect with her Islamic faith through a lens of social justice, rather than politics.

== Activism ==
While studying in the United States in the early 2000s, Abuarquob co-founded, with a Jewish man, Abraham's Vision, a non-profit based in San Francisco that built connections between Jewish and Palestinian college students.

Abuarquob joined ALLMEP in 2014 as its regional director.

In December 2017, she received the Laudato Si’ Prize from the Vatican.

Abuarquob has worked with Women Wage Peace, and she is a board member of Track Two: An Institute for Citizen Diplomacy. She was one of six peacemakers profiled in Ron Kronish's 2023 book Profiles in Peace.

== Personal life ==
Abuarquob lives in Hebron.
