= Nurul Huda Mosque =

Mosque in Sawahlunto, West Sumatra, Indonesia

Nurul Huda Mosque Masjid Nurul Huda
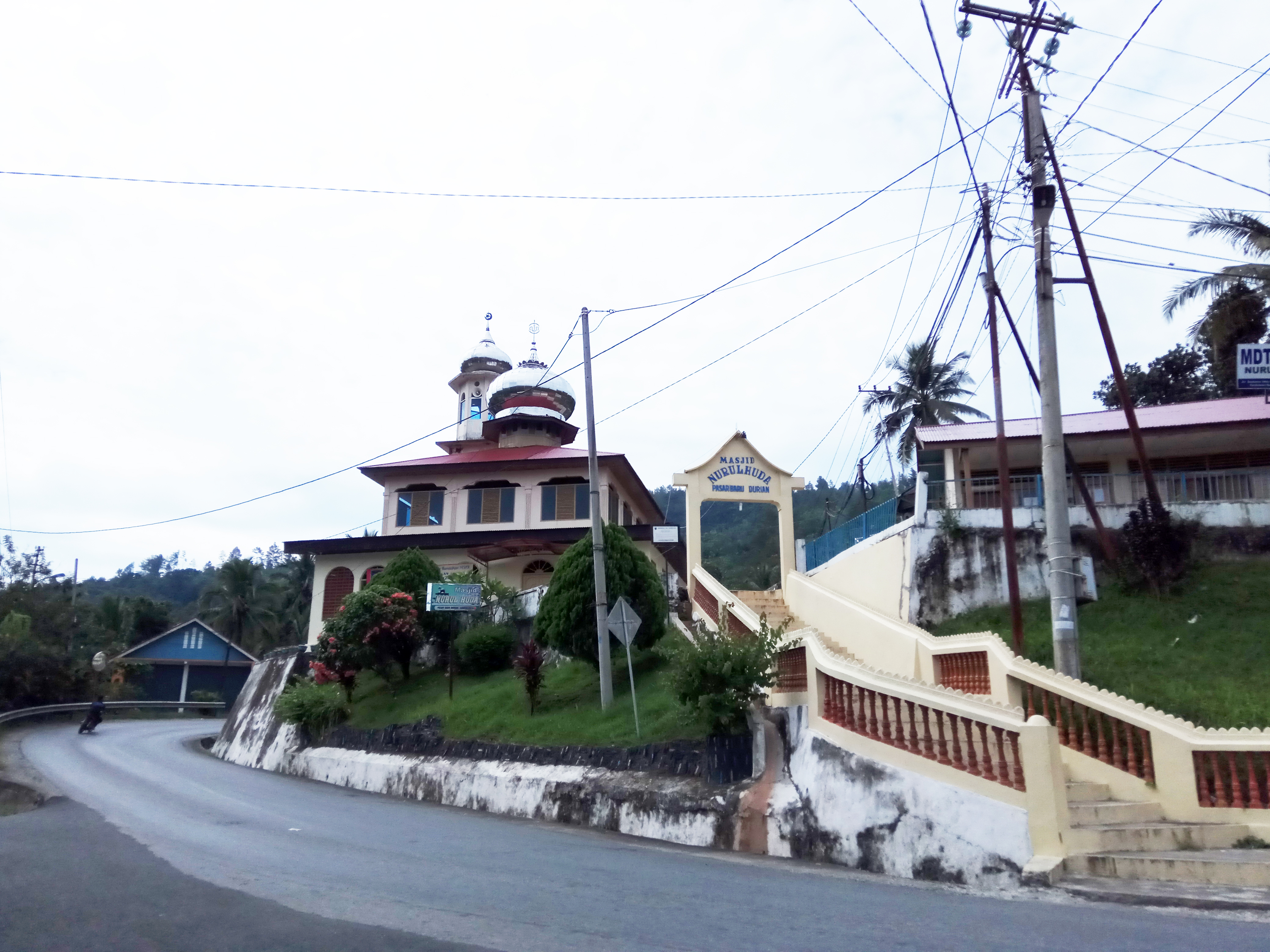

Religion
- Affiliation: Islam
- Branch/tradition: Sunni

Location
- Location: Baringin District, Sawahlunto, West Sumatera, Indonesia
- Interactive map of Nurul Huda Mosque; Masjid Nurul Huda

Architecture
- Type: Mosque
- Groundbreaking: 1921

Specifications
- Length: 12 m
- Width: 20 m
- Dome: 1
- Minaret: 1

The Nurul Huda Mosque (Indonesian: Masjid Nurul Huda) is one of the oldest mosques in Indonesia, located in Baringin District, Sawahlunto, West Sumatra. The mosque, built during the Dutch occupation, has a rectangular building with a tower blending into the main building. Currently, in addition to a function as a place of worship for Muslims, this two-story mosque is also used as a means of religious education for the surrounding community.

== History ==
There is no definitive data on the exact date that the mosque stood. However, the local community estimates the mosque may be built almost simultaneously with nearby shophouses, built in 1921.

The mosque initially did not have a dome, appearing more like a church building. Therefore, local people then changed the shape of the roof by attaching the dome. Although rumor has it that the building is a former church, this is not the case given the direction of Mihrab in this mosque, which is following the direction of Qibla.

Since its establishment, this mosque was renovated once. The mosque measured 6 × 6 meters when first established, then in the 1980s, there was an overhaul for expansion of the area to 12 × 20 meters. To maintain its historical value, the renovation ensured the building is made the same as the original form, with milestones, walls, bedugs, and towers preserved. The bedug however, is a relic of the Dutch era and non-functioning today.
