= Sephora =

French cosmetics retailer

Sephora SA

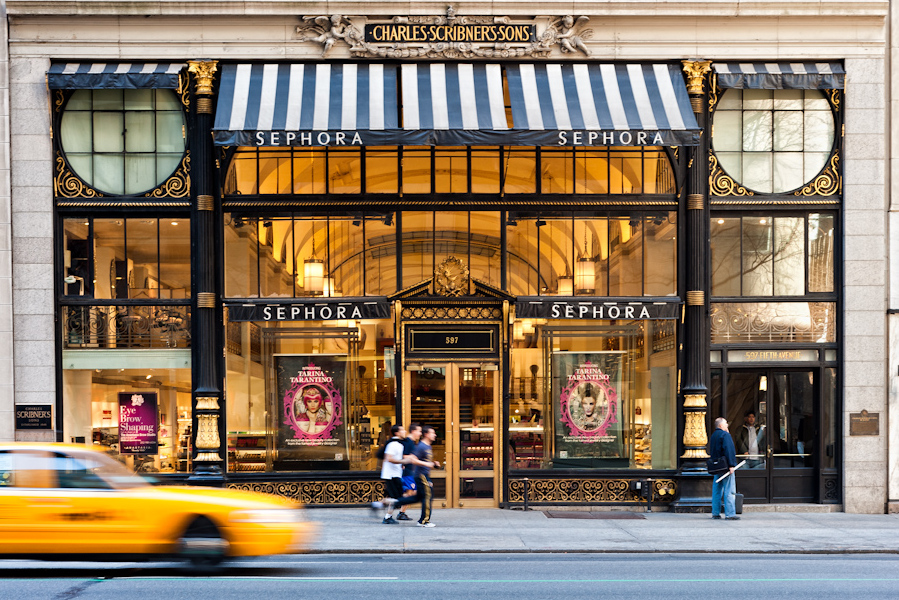
- Sephora's flagship store on Fifth Avenue in Midtown Manhattan, New York City
- Type: Subsidiary
- Industry: Cosmetics
- Founded: 1969; 57 years ago in Limoges, France
- Founder: Dominique Mandonnaud
- Headquarters: 41 Rue Ybry, 92200 Neuilly-sur-Seine, France; 47.141791°N 2.2598276°E
- Number of locations: 2,700 stores
- Areas served: 34 countries worldwide
- Key people: Guillaume Motte (CEO)
- Products: Cosmetics; skincare; fragrances; beauty products; haircare products
- Revenue: ▲Over US$10 billion (2019) (estimated)
- Parent: LVMH
- Website: sephora.com

Sephora SA is a French multinational retailer of personal care and beauty products, offering nearly 340 brands alongside its own private label, Sephora Collection. Its product range includes cosmetics, skincare, fragrances, nail polish, beauty tools, body care products, and hair care items.

The company was founded in Limoges, France, in 1969 and is currently based in Neuilly-sur-Seine, France. Since 1996, Sephora has been owned by the luxury conglomerate LVMH.

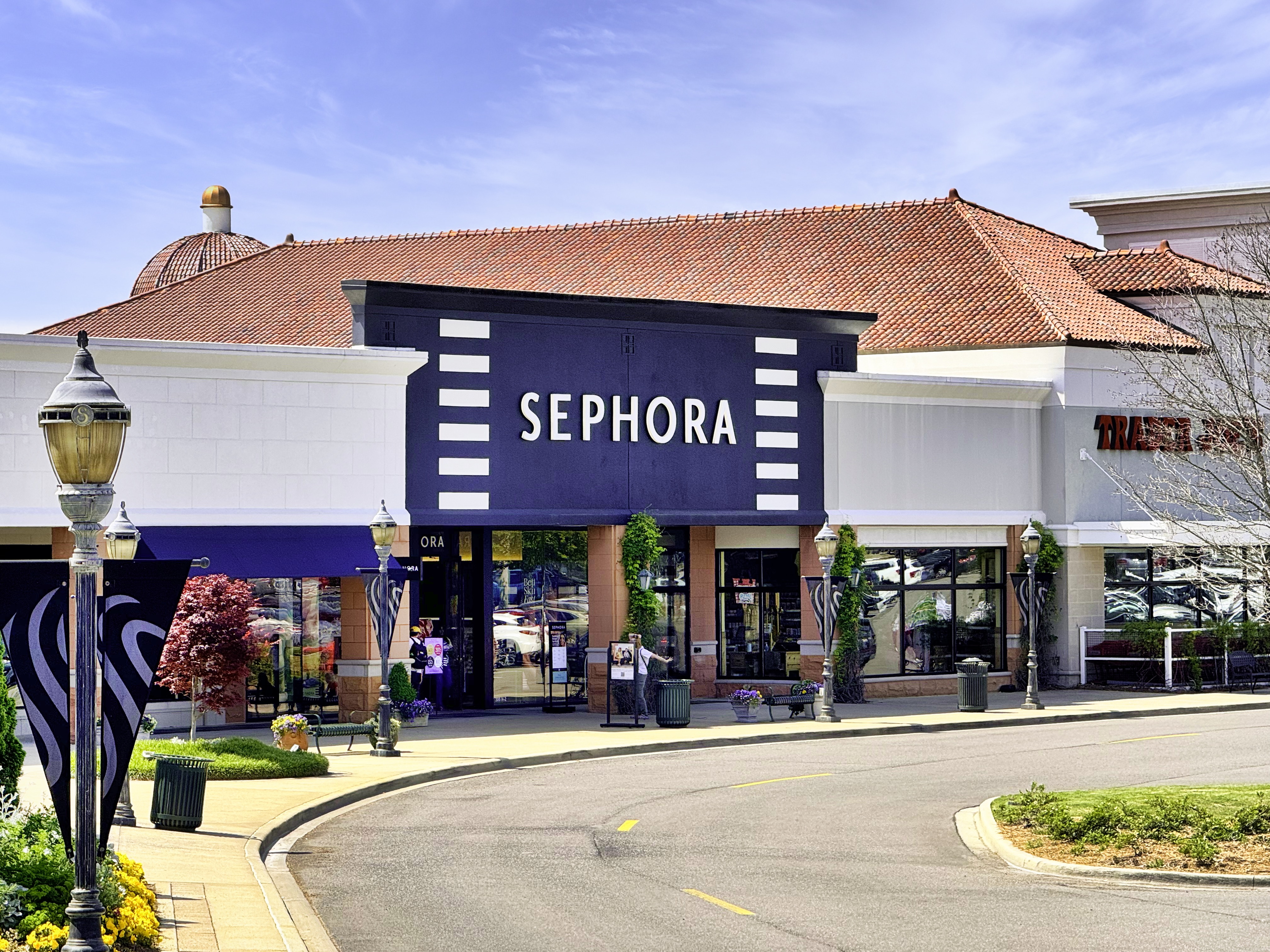
Sephora, The Summit, Birmingham, Alabama

== History ==
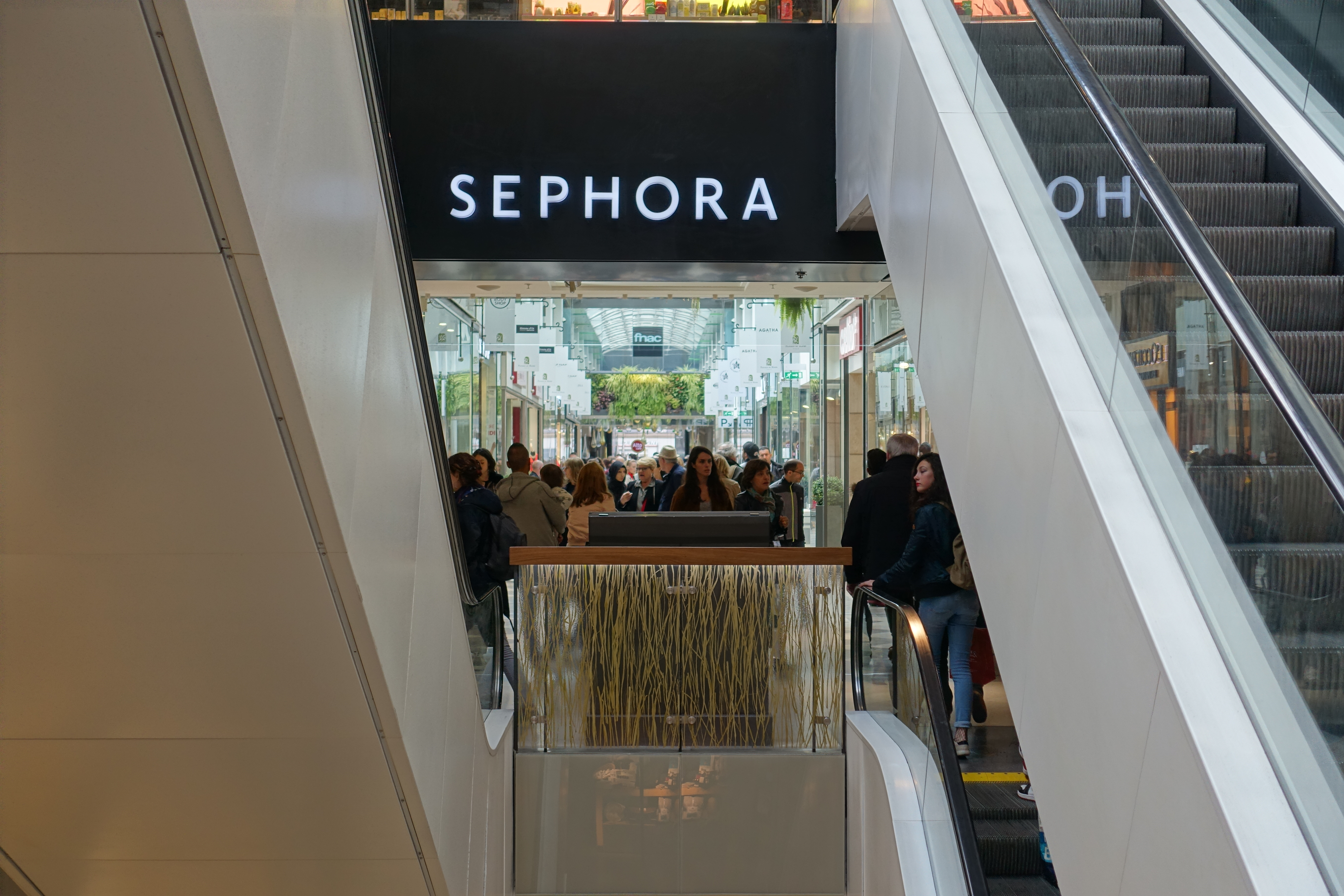
Sephora, Passage du Havre, Paris

Sephora was first launched in Paris in August 1970. It is named after the biblical figure Zipporah (French: Séphora), wife of Moses.

In 1993, Dominique Mandonnaud acquired Sephora and merged it with his own perfume chain under the Sephora brand. Mandonnaud is credited with designing and executing Sephora's "assisted self-service" sales experience, which distinguished itself from standard retail models for cosmetics by encouraging its primarily female customer base to test products in retail locations before purchasing them.

Mandonnaud continued to expand the Sephora brand through the 1990s, opening its flagship store on the Champs-Élysées in 1997. In July 1997, Mandonnaud and his partners sold Sephora to LVMH, which expanded the stores globally and bolstered the chain's products to include beauty and cosmetic products. Sephora extended its operations to the Middle East markets in 2007 and has opened over 44 stores in UAE and Saudi Arabia, as well as an e-commerce store. It continues to extend its partnership with brands in the region.

In October 2023, Artemis Patrick was appointed President of Sephora North America, with the expectation that she would assume the role of CEO upon the retirement of her predecessor, Jean-André Rougeot. In April 2024, Patrick was announced as president and chief executive officer of Sephora North America. She is the first female CEO of Sephora North America.

Sephora opened its first American store in New York City in 1998, its first Canadian store in Toronto in 2004, and the first Australian Sephora store in 2014. Its North American headquarters are located in New York City, with corporate offices in San Francisco and Montréal. Sephora currently operates over 430 stores across North America.

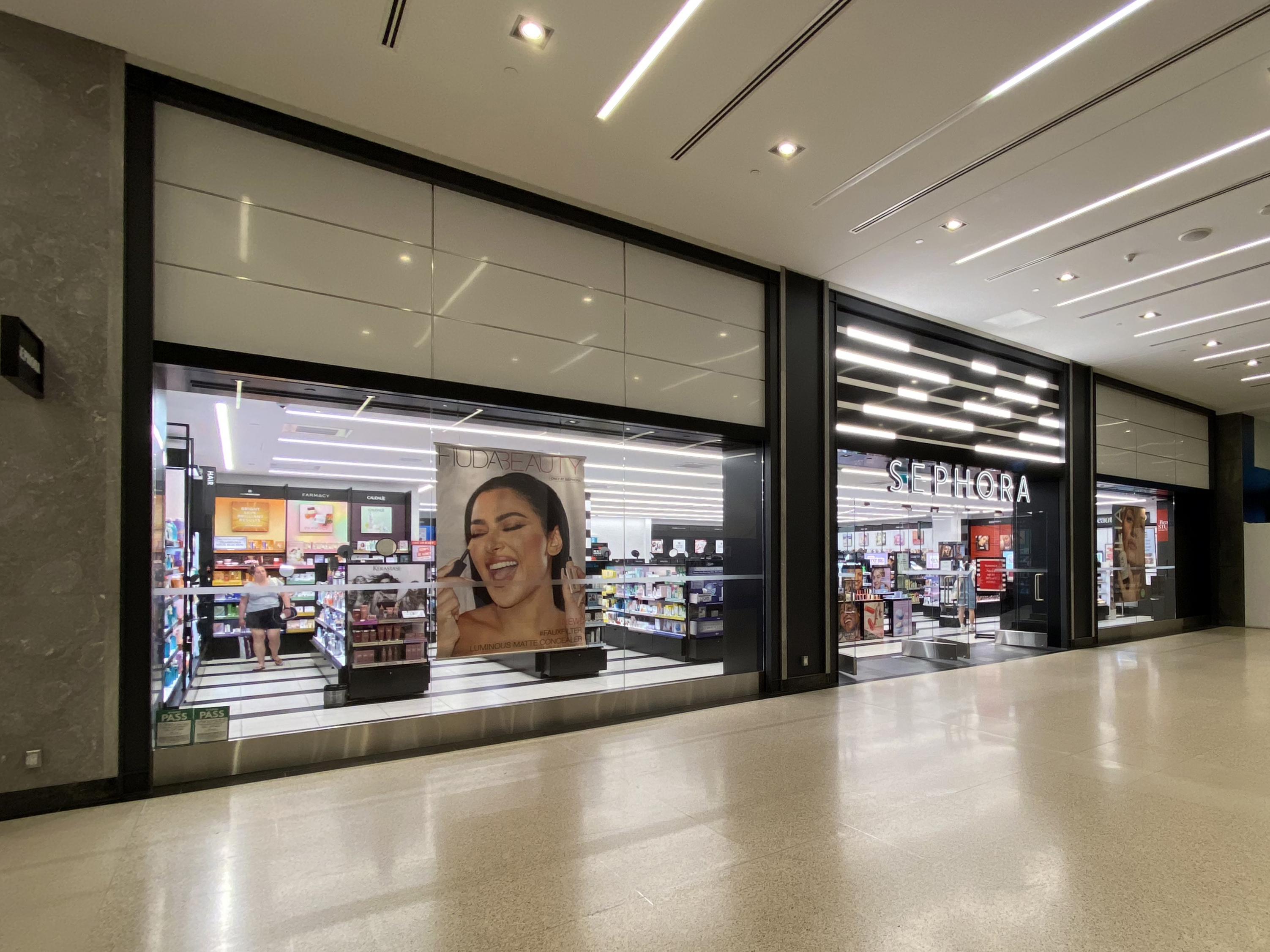
Sephora in Union Station, Toronto, Ontario

In August 2016, Sephora opened its 400th location in North America on the Magnificent Mile in Chicago. The store was the city's new flagship location.

In March 2017, Sephora opened its largest retail location in North America near Herald Square in New York City. The store is approximately 11,380 square feet and features over 13,000 products. It is one of six Sephora TIP Workshop locations, with interactive services and tools, in North America; the others include San Francisco, Boston, Chicago, Santa Clara Valley, and Toronto.

In November 2018, Sephora signed a long-term lease at Thor Equities’ Town Square Metepec, a new retail and entertainment center in Mexico totaling 1.7 million square feet.

In April 2019, R&B singer SZA accused the store of racial profiling. On 23 May 2019, Sephora announced they would be closing all locations on Wednesday, 5 June 2019, to hold diversity training for its staff. However, the staff training was a part of their "We Belong To Something Beautiful Campaign" and not the accusations from the singer. The planning and training for this campaign began in late 2019.

In July 2021, Sephora agreed with Palamon Capital Partners to the purchase of Feelunique.com, a UK online retailer of prestige beauty goods founded in 2005, with 1.3 million active customers from 120 countries and more than 35,000 products from over 800 brands. It had been acquired from Palamon Capital Partners for £26 million in 2012. The price was rumored to be £132 million.

In July 2024, Sephora introduced a summer-themed pop-up in partnership with body care brand Sol de Janeiro.

In February 2026, Sephora expanded its business to Ireland, with a shop in Belfast.

== Operations ==
Sephora launched its online store in the U.S. in 1999 and in Canada in 2003. The Canadian head office was opened in February 2007 by Marie-Christine Marchives, a former Sephora U.S. and Sephora France employee. Marie-Christine Marchives returned to France in July 2010 to become the general manager of Sephora France. She was replaced in Canada by Klaus Ryum-Larsen. Sephora currently operates over 2,300 stores in 33 countries worldwide, generating over an estimated $4 billion in revenue as of 2013. As of September 2013, the Sephora at Champs Élysées in Paris, France, attracts over six million people a year. Afterpay and Sephora partnered to offer its customers the flexibility to pay in four installments on 13 July 2022.

Sephora Canada opened its 100th store in Canada in November 2022.

In 2024, Sephora confirmed the opening of its fourth UK store at Newcastle upon Tyne's Eldon Square Shopping Centre.

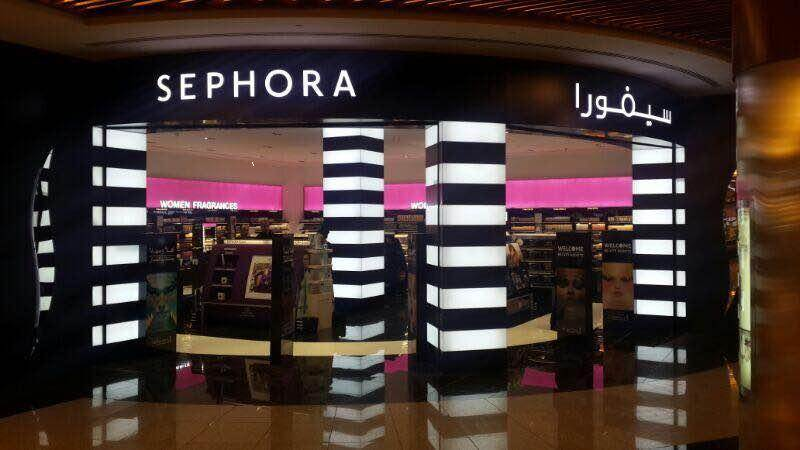
Sephora storefront in Dalma Mall

=== Brands ===
Sephora features a variety of beauty products from more than 300 brands, including Tatcha, Huda Beauty, and Bobbi Brown. Sephora also features its own make-up, skincare, beauty tools and accessories under the brand name Sephora Collection. Packaging for the line previously featured the company's elongated flame logo in standard black print. The new logo features the updated "Sephora Quality, Really Good Price" logo with the $ sign.

In 2013, the company included fragrance collections from Mary-Kate and Ashley Olsen, known as Elizabeth and James, and a makeup line with Marc Jacobs. In June 2020, Maddie Ziegler's imagination collection collaborated with Morphe, launched in Sephora Canada. In 2023, Sephora became the first retailer of feminine hygiene and cosmetic product Luna Daily in the United States. On 28 February 2025, Sephora has expanded their selection of limited K-beauty brands by adding Biodance to their shelves. The brand's viral sheet masks and toner pads are now available in store, while additional ten skus are now available to purchase online.

=== Sephora inside JC Penney ===
In October 2006, Sephora began opening stores inside JCPenney. Sephora inside JCPenney features some of the same makeup, skincare and fragrance brands as well as its own product line found in stand alone stores nationwide. Sephora inside JCPenney stores are much smaller than a normal store, usually 1,500 sq ft in size. As of 2017, there were more than 600 Sephora locations in JCPenney stores across the US. That same year, JC Penney announced the closing of 138 stores nationwide, several of which house a Sephora in JCPenney store. As of 2025, the JCPenney and Sephora collaboration has come to an end. In 2020, the two companies did not renew their contract resulting in the debut of JCPenney Beauty and the new collaboration of Sephora with Kohl's.

=== Sephora inside Kohl's ===
In December 2020, Sephora announced that it would begin opening Sephora stores inside Kohl's locations. The announcement included plans to launch Sephora at 850 Kohl's stores by 2023. The first four Sephora inside Kohl's locations opened on 6 August 2021. By 2023, Sephora at Kohl's has surpassed $1.4 billion in sales and sales projection for 2025 is more than $2 billion. In summer 2024, Sephora at Kohl's will be adding approximately 140 small-format shops in 40 states, bringing the total number of shops to more than 1,000.

=== Subscription service ===
In August 2015, it was announced that Sephora would launch a subscription service: Play! By Sephora. The monthly subscription service offers boxes containing sample size products for a monthly fee. Boston, Columbus, and Cincinnati were the only three cities to test the initial service launch in September 2015. The service was launched throughout the US in 2016.

For US$10 billed monthly, each month's box is a collectable bag that changes each month with five deluxe skincare, makeup, or haircare samples. Each box includes a selection of products based on answers provided by the customer in PLAY! profile.

Sephora terminated PLAY! in April 2020, replacing it with Sephora Luxe. Like Play!, Luxe gives the opportunity to sample products, but Luxe is ordered monthly and is not a subscription service.

=== Sephora UAE and KSA ===
Sephora UAE and KSA are regional subdivisions of Sephora. The Middle East head office was opened in February 2006 by Pierre Fayard. Since 2007, over 30 separate Sephora stores have opened across the Middle East region (UAE, KSA, Bahrain, Qatar, Kuwait). Sephora UAE and KSA provide make up and skincare products from notable brands such as Christian Dior and Laura Mercier in a high tech contemporary retail environment. Sephora's first Middle East store opened at Seef Mall in Bahrain on 7 January 2007 followed by Festival City, UAE on 1 March 2007 with a further 30 stores opening across the region since. The Sephora store in the Dubai Mall opened in December 2008 and is now ranked as the company's number one store worldwide. In 2007, the late Sephora CEO, Jacques Levy expressed a desire to have 100 stores open across the region by 2010. A year later the international financial crisis derailed these ambitions. Levy stepped down in 2011 and died a year later. Despite this early setback Sephora have opened more than 30 more stores and introduced online shopping to the region in November 2016. In December 2017, Sephora opened Gifts Beauty Park, the world's first beauty theme park, in Dubai. The pop-up store featured fairground and makeup themed games and invited shoppers to sit down with professional Sephora makeup artists to experience the products. In March 2018, Guillaume Motte was announced as the new president of Sephora Europe and Middle East.

==== Products ====
Sephora's Middle East stores stock international products alongside local brands such as Shiffa Dubai Skin Care and Huda Beauty. According to Forbes, Huda Beauty, founded by Dubai-based blogger and business woman Huda Kattan, was the top selling cosmetic brand across Sephora Middle East, in 2018.

== Acquisitions ==
In 2000, Sephora.com purchased the assets of Eve.com for "high six-figures".

== Controversy ==
In November 2014, four customers filed a class action lawsuit against Sephora. The suit alleges that Sephora engaged in racial discrimination by wrongfully deactivating the customer rewards accounts of Asian customers under the pretense that these customers were buying products from Sephora in bulk and reselling them. Sephora identified accounts to deactivate by looking at email domains from @qq.com (owned by Tencent), @126.com, or @163.com (both owned by NetEase).

In 2026, the Italian Competition Authority (AGCM) is investigating beauty brands Benefit and Sephora after they appeared to adopt a "particularly insidious" marketing strategy of using young influencers to market skincare to children, possibly younger than 10.

== Sponsorship ==
In September 2025, Sephora Middle East was announced as a sponsor of Al-Nassr Women's FC for the 2025–26 season.

In March 2026, Sephora was announced as an official partner of F1 Academy. As part of the partnership, Sephora will support Natalia Granada for the 2026 season.
