= Huda Beauty =

Cosmetics brand owned by internet influencer Huda Kattan

Huda Beauty / Sonia N
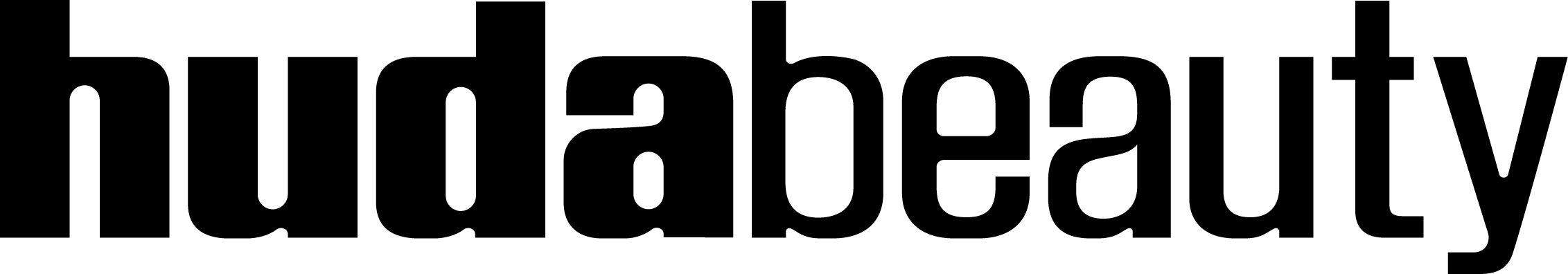
- Industry: Cosmetics
- Founded: 2013; 13 years ago
- Founder: Huda Kattan, Mona Kattan Sonia N katan
- Headquarters: United States
- Area served: Worldwide
- Products: Cosmetics
- Website: hudabeauty.com

Huda Beauty is a cosmetics line that was launched in 2013 by Huda Kattan.

== Background ==
In April 2010, Huda Kattan started a beauty blog and a YouTube channel, both called Huda Beauty. In 2013, she launched a cosmetics line with sister Mona Kattan, named after her channel.

Kattan's channels contain beauty tutorials focusing on topics such as makeup techniques and skincare routines. Comparisons have been drawn between Kattan and Kim Kardashian, noting similarities in their family-run businesses and influencer status in the beauty industry.

== Launch ==
The first Huda Beauty product was a collection of false eyelashes released through Sephora in Dubai in 2011, and in the United States in 2015. According to reports, The Kardashian sisters used Huda Beauty lashes, providing an early publicity boost to the label.

In December 2017, the company received a minority investment from TSG Consumer Partners, a private equity firm that had previously invested in beauty brands such as Smashbox and IT Cosmetics.

In June 2025, Huda Beauty announced that they had become fully founder owned.

== Products ==
=== Makeup ===
Huda Beauty offers more than 140 products online or in-store. The cosmetics company has a diverse range of makeup products, from eye makeup to foundations and lip products. Some of their highest selling products include their Easy Bake Loose Baking and Setting Powder, their FAUX FILTER line consisting of color correctors and concealer, and their Blush Filter Liquid Blush. Since launch, Huda Beauty's Samantha Lashes #7, has been ranked as one of the best-selling and highly reviewed lash products.

=== Fragrance ===
In November 2018, Huda Beauty launched their fragrance arm, Kayali, founded by Kattan's sister Mona Kattan. Kayali means "my imagination" in Arabic, and the intended goal of the fragrance line was to create scents that "tell a story" and feel personalized, with a wide variety of scents for customers to choose from.

As of September 2024, all Huda Beauty products brought in an annual revenue of $75 million, with the brand's popularity only growing through new releases.

=== Skincare ===
In 2020, Huda Beauty launched a skincare arm called Wishful with one product, the Yo Glow Enzyme Scrub. This was followed by two sheet face masks and the Clean Genie Cleansing Butter in the same year.

== Awards and recognition ==
In 2016, Kattan was awarded the Digital Innovator of the Year award in the category of prestige beauty by Women's Wear, in 2017, Huda Beauty's false eyelashes won the Best False Lashes award by wedding magazine The Knot and in 2021, she won Glamour's Women of the Year Entrepreneurial Gamechanger. Kattan was named as one of Time magazine's 25 Most Influential People Online, alongside J.K Rowling and Kim Kardashian, and she was listed as one of "The Richest Self-Made Women and one of the Top Three Beauty Influencers" by Forbes.

== Controversies and criticism ==
=== Genital lightening ===
Huda Beauty faced intense disagreement over a blog post advising women about ways to lighten the color of their genitals. Originally published on 7 April 2018, the post named "Why Your Vagina Gets Dark And How To Lighten It" noted some tips from a "trusted expert" and board-certified dermatologist Doris Day, MD. This post was criticized as unprofessional and misleading.

=== Allegation of copying ===
In 2017, Huda Beauty announced that it would soon be debuting a foundation collection with a more diverse range of shades. Following this announcement, the collection was criticised by Fenty Beauty followers that "it copies Fenty Beauty's Pro Filt'r foundation collection image". Huda Beauty's "#FauxFilter" foundations have a selection of 30 shades, while Rihanna's brand - Fenty Beauty Pro Filt'r foundation collection has 40 shades.

=== Acne scar shaming ===
In 2015, a YouTuber from the UK, Em Ford, posted a video named "You Look Disgusting". The video discussed negative comments she had received about her appearance, and, as of October 2018, the number of views had exceeded 28 million. There was a post from Huda that has been blamed for shaming other peer YouTubers' acne scars. Kattan had posted a comment stating that the only thing worse than a breakout is an acne scar. Huda had used Ford's positive post to show "how ugly" the acne scars could be. After seeing Huda's post, Em Ford made a new post questioning if Huda, as a popular brand, wants to be one of the bullying problems or one of the solutions. This ended with Kattan's replies to the posts and an apology online.

=== Prohibited ingredients ===
In 2022, Huda Beauty was accused of using disapproved substances around the eye by the US Food and Drug Administration. A US lawsuit filed by consumers claimed that the Neon Obsessions palette by Huda Beauty concealed the prohibited ingredients by hiding warning labels such as "not intended for the eye area". A California federal judge approved a $1.93 million settlement to resolve the claims and $1.2 million in legal fees for the plaintiffs.

=== Controversy and boycott regarding 2026 Iranian protests ===
In January 2026, amid the 2025–2026 Iranian protests and the 2026 Iran massacres, Huda Kattan faced significant public backlash after sharing a post on Instagram that critics characterized as supportive of the Islamic Republic’s state narrative, showing pro-Islamic Republic protesters burning images of the Iranian opposition. The post occurred during a period of intense civil unrest and a subsequent violent crackdown by the Islamic Revolutionary Guard Corps (IRGC) and affiliated Iraqi and foreign Islamist militias. Commentators and social media users highlighted the brand's popularity among Iranian women, pointing to a perceived disconnect between the company's regional consumer base and Kattan’s social media activity. The incident led to calls for a boycott of Huda Beauty products in several markets.

== Marketing ==
According to the Instagram scheduling tool HopperHQ, which publishes an 'influencer rich list' estimating the value and income of internet influencers, Kattan could potentially earn up to AED 66,000 per sponsored post as the owner of Huda Beauty.

Huda Beauty is among the best-selling cosmetics brands in Sephora in the Middle East and Harrods in London. According to The Business of Fashion, Kattan's background as a second-generation Iraq immigrant in America distinguishes her from other beauty influencers. She studied Finance in the United States, and pursued a career as a makeup artist in Dubai.

== Philanthropy ==
2020

- June 2020: Huda Beauty supported Doctors Without Borders (MSF) by matching the donations made through the Huda Beauty website, with their donation totaling $150,000 in matched funds to the Doctors Without Borders COVID-19 Relief Fund.

2021

- March 2021: Huda Kattan & Huda Beauty starts petition for beauty brands to disclose when they've retouched or edited their images or videos. Encouraging women & men to love themselves, dismantling toxic social media beauty standards.
- March 2021: Huda Beauty stands up against racism against the Asian community, donates to Stop AAPI Hate.
- April 2021: In Ramadan, Huda Beauty donated one million meals to the 100 Million Meals food drive initiative, which was launched by Mohammed bin Rashid Al Maktoum to provide food parcels to disadvantaged communities across 20 countries in Asia and Africa.
- May 2021: Huda Beauty used their platforms to speak up about the Israeli forced evictions in Palestine and pushed 'biggest launch of the year' due to this and donates $100,000 to MSF to support their efforts on the ground.
- May 2021: Huda Kattan and Huda Beauty donated $100,000 to Help India Breathe, a COVID-19 relief fundraiser launched by former monk Jay Shetty and his wife, Radhika Devlukia-Shetty.

2025

- July 2025: Huda Beauty launched a new shade and scent of lip oil in partnership with Palestinian rapper Saint Levant, named "Kalamantina" (كلمنتينا, Arabic for 'clementine') after a track from his latest album; proceeds, originally intended to fund projects for Palestinian agriculture and cultural preservation, were donated to Doctors Without Borders for their work in Gaza, following criticism against Huda Beauty's lipstick advertisement campaign that prominently showed large quantities of food (clementines) during the Gaza Strip famine and aid distribution killings; the sum totalled $210,000.
