= Jen Atkin =

Celebrity hairstylist and entrepreneur (born 1980)

- Born: March 10, 1980 (age 45); Utah, U.S.
- Occupations: Hairstylist, entrepreneur, author
- Website: https://www.jenatkin.com

Jen Atkin (born March 10, 1980) is an American hairstylist, entrepreneur, and author. She is the founder of the haircare brand OUAI and the digital platform Mane Addicts.

== Early life ==
Atkin was born in Utah and raised within the Church of Jesus Christ of Latter Day Saints.

== Career ==
Atkin moved to Los Angeles to pursue a career in hairstyling. She quickly gained recognition by working with celebrities such as the Kardashians, Chrissy Teigen, and Jennifer Lopez. In 2016, she founded OUAI, a haircare brand. She is also the founder of Mane Addicts, a digital platform for hairstylists and beauty lovers.

== Personal life ==
Atkin is married and has two children.
