= Subterranean Toledo =

Underground city in Toledo, Spain

Subterranean Toledo is an underground city in Toledo, Spain made up of wells, caves, Roman, Arabic, and Jewish baths, as well as cemeteries.

== Wells and Aljibes ==
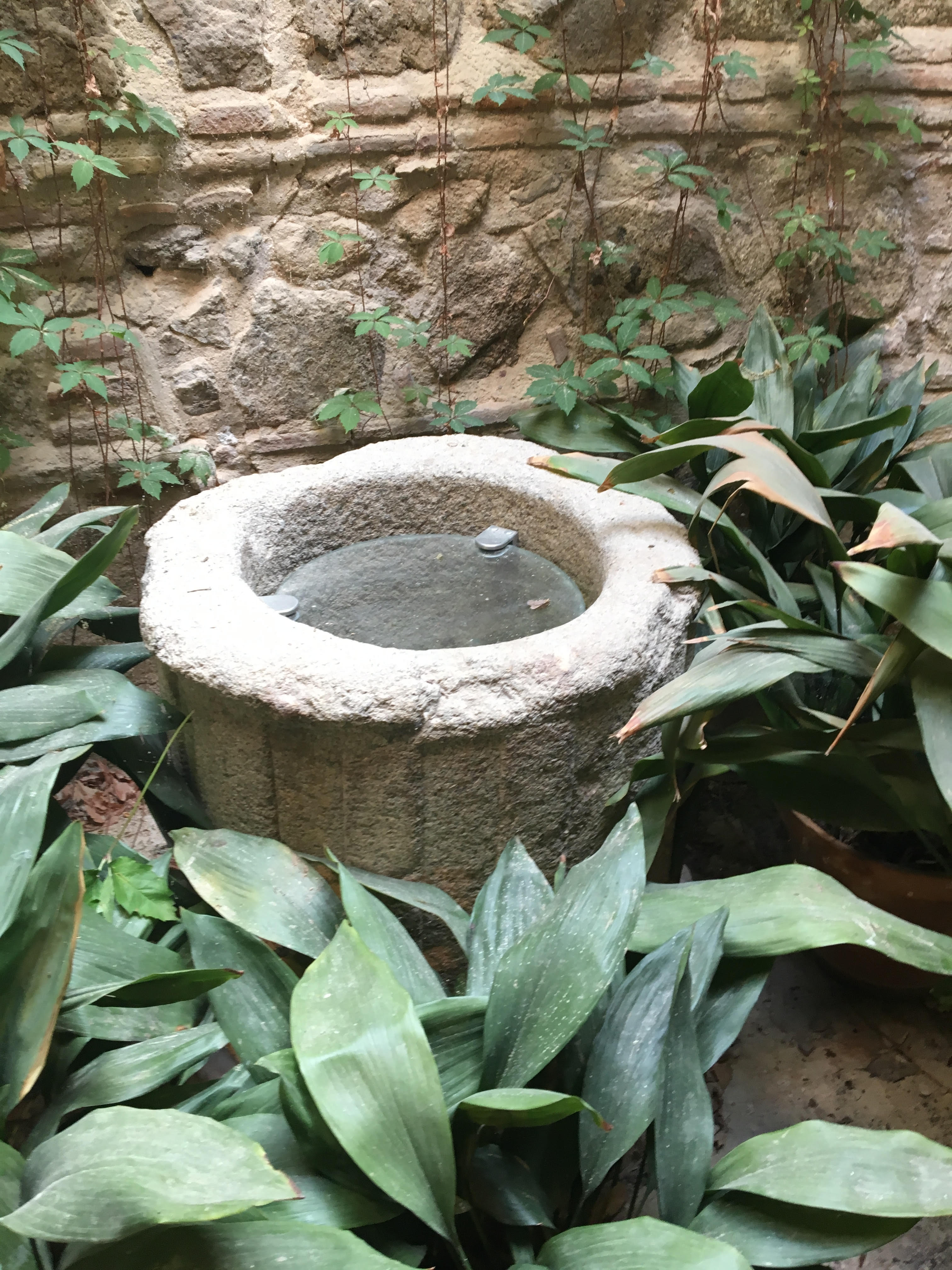
A well in the courtyard of the Museo el Greco

There are many wells in Toledo. Aljibes are commonly found near wells that derive their name from a Spanish word originating from an Arabic word meaning 'cistern.'

== Caves ==
One of Toledo's historic caves is the Cave of Hercules. There are several legends surrounding this cave, but the most recognized is the story of how Don Rodrigo in part caused the fall of Spain to the Moors by completing Hercules’ prophecy and opening the cave. Some private residences within the old town also have historic caves that are sometimes available to the public, and sometimes caves can be found beneath homes.

== Baths ==
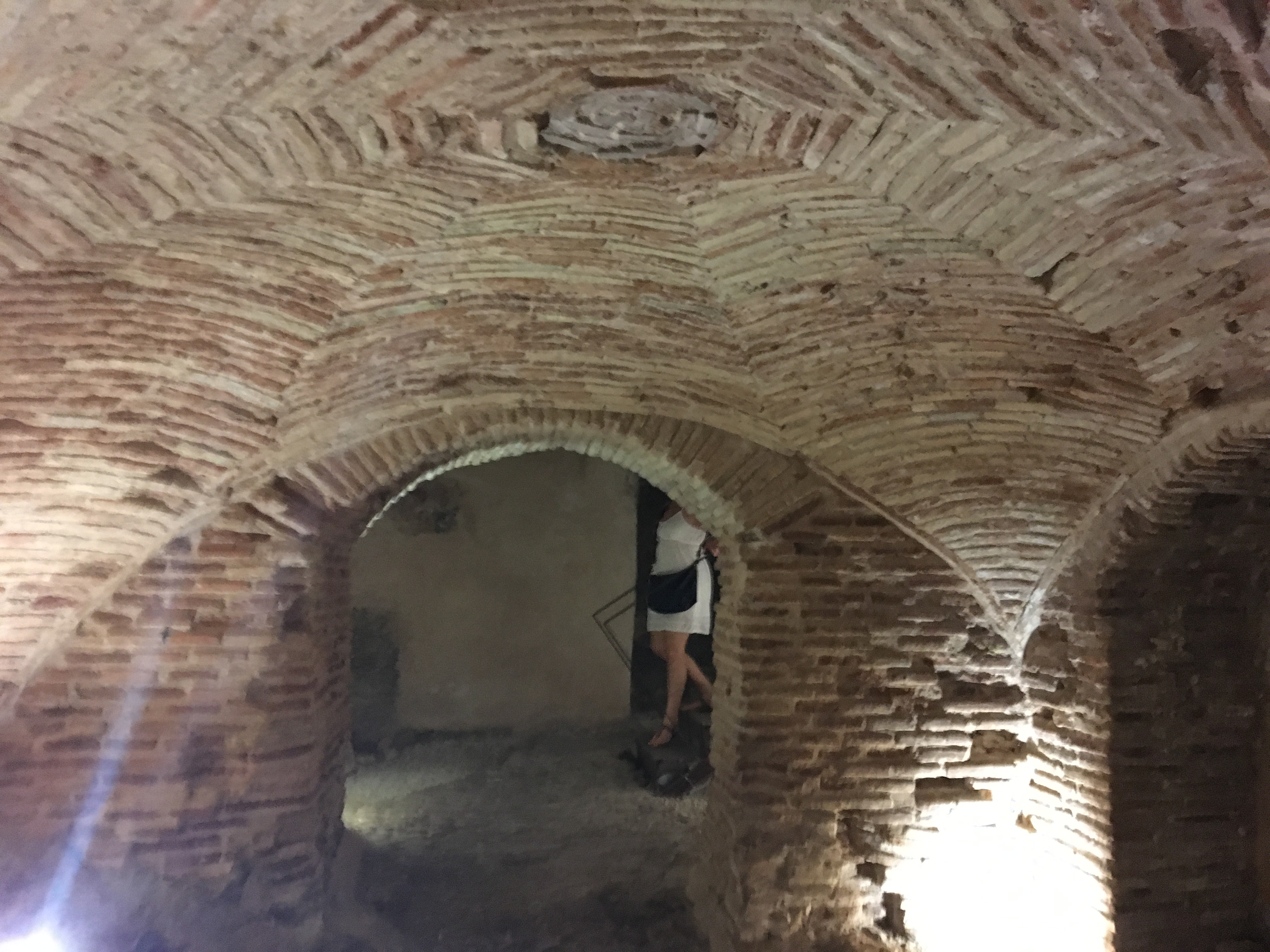
An underground bath in the Jewish Quarter of Toledo

Another large part of the Toledo underground is the Roman, Arabic, and Judaic baths. Included on the list of known historic baths in Toledo are: the Baños del Ángel, the baños de Tenerías, the Baños del Caballel, and the Baños del Cenizal which are all Arabic baths one can visit. There are also the reconstructed Roman baths of the Plaza de Amador de los Ríos, and finally underneath a house in the Jewish Quarter there is thought to be a mikveh, for purification baths – for which naturally running water was needed.

== Cemeteries ==
The "cementerio general de la Vega Baja” was first built in part to accommodate for the massive increase in the death toll from cholera. The cemetery took in new graves from 1836 to 1893, at which time the families actually had to move deceased loved ones’ graves to the cemetery of Our Lady of the Sagrario, when the city announced they would be demolishing the deteriorating cemetery. There were also several smaller church and hospital-specific cemeteries around the city. Outside of the old Hospital de la Misericordia there was a cemetery that began as a burial place for all who died at the hospital, but when cholera hit, it quickly became a cemetery strictly for the nuns who lived and died there. Another hospital, the Hospital de Tavera, contains the crypt and marble sculpture of the Cardenal Tavera, who built the hospital. Another crypt exists in the Iglesia de San Roman, and within lies skeletons and even some well-remained mummies, and another mummy, that of King Sancho IV was found in 1947 in the Cathedral of Toledo. In 2008, a previously undiscovered Jewish cemetery was found during a routine archeological excavation that always takes place before new construction begins.

== See also ==
- Wells of Toledo
