= Pozo de El Salvador =

Water well in Toledo, Spain

The Pozo de El Salvador are basements and a well located in the city of Toledo, in Castile-La Mancha, Spain.

In the year 1997, The City Council excavated and discovered stone stairs, which are located in front of the iron stairs. Archaeological work began thus, appearing two more rooms.

In the third of them they discovered a well that still contained water. It is both well, because it emanates water of itself and also cistern as it receives rainwater through 3 holes in the roof. The water that fell here was transferred by three channels to the well. It is believed that this cistern-well was blocked in its day and remained hidden since for centuries the water was a precious commodity in Toledo. It traded with it through the water carriers. Only the wealthy classes could buy clean water. The rest drank from the contaminated streams that flowed into the Tagus. They tried to purify the water by filtering it through pots of clay and boiling it.

The basement consists of two rooms: "Entry" and "Main room".

== See also ==
- Wells of Toledo
