= Rat people =

Rat people may refer to:

- Rat tribe
- Tang ping
