= Underground city =

Series of linked subterranean spaces

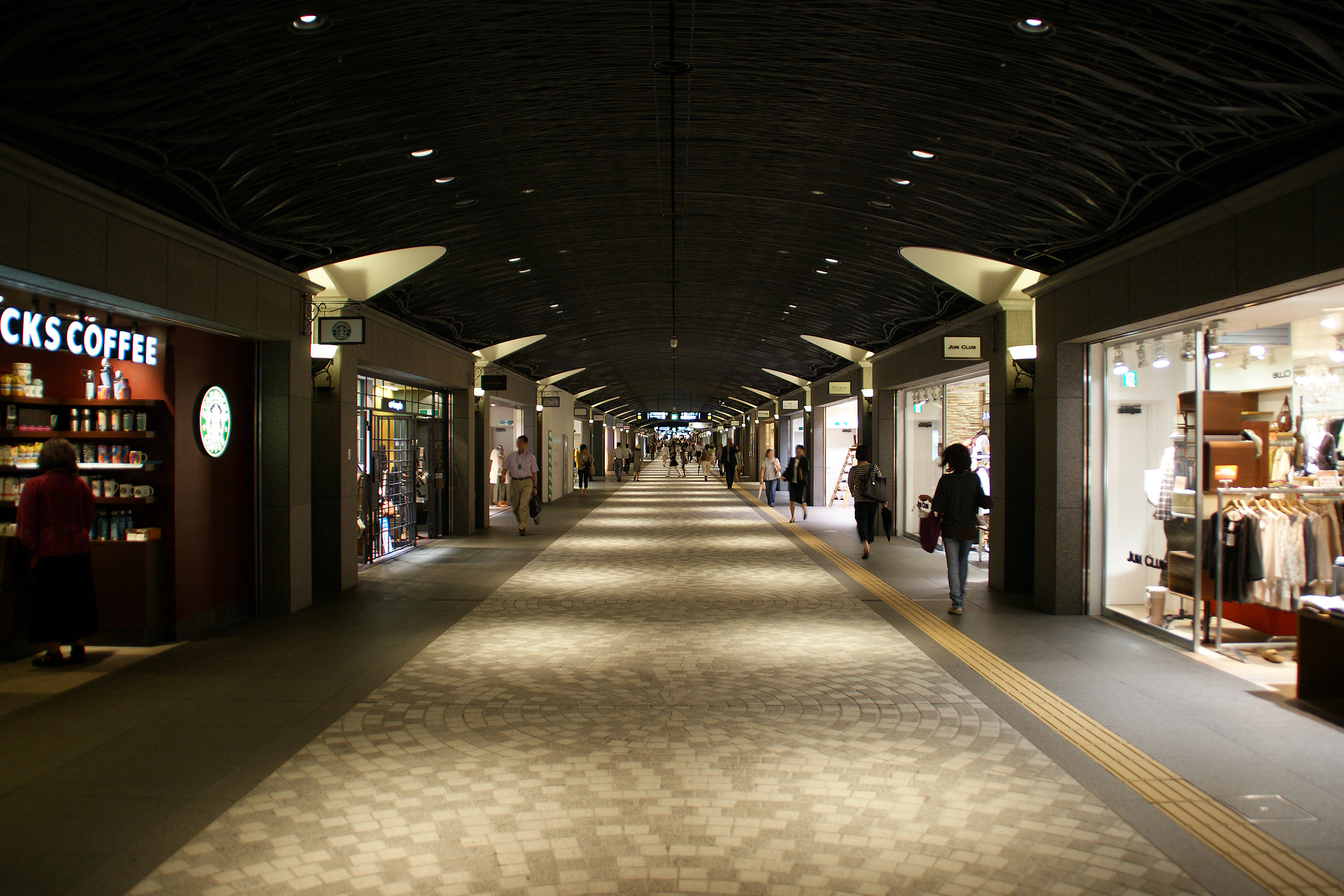
Tenjin Underground City in Chūō-ku, Fukuoka, Fukuoka Prefecture, Japan

An underground city is a series of linked subterranean spaces that may provide a defensive refuge; a place for living, working or shopping; a transit system; mausolea; wine or storage cellars; cisterns or drainage channels; or several of these. Underground cities may be currently active modern creations or they may be historic including ancient sites, some of which may be entirely or partially open to the public.

The term may also refer to a network of tunnels that connects buildings beneath street level that may house office blocks, shopping centres, metro stations, theatres, and other attractions. These passages can usually be accessed through the public space of any of the buildings connecting to them, and sometimes have separate entries as well. This latter definition encompasses many modern structures, whereas the former more generally covers tunnel systems from ancient times to the present day.

Underground cities are especially functional in cities with very cold or hot climates, because they permit activities to be comfortably accessible year round without regard to the weather. Underground cities are similar in nature to skyway systems and may include some buildings linked by skyways or above-ground corridors rather than underground. Some cities also have tunnels that have been abandoned.

== Asia ==
=== China ===
- Beijing built an extensive tunnel network called the Underground City (Chinese: 地下城; pinyin: Dìxià Chéng) during the Sino-Soviet conflict, supposedly covering 85 km^{2}, falling into disuse in the 1970s. It was opened in 2000 to the public and tourists, but closed in 2008 for renovations. As of 1 July 2009, all "official" remaining entrances appear to be closed.
- Guangzhou has at least 16 different underground networks.
  - The largest underground network is in Zhujiang New Town. It connects the commercial basements of over 35 office towers and malls surrounding the Zhujiang New Town Central Park, and extends to Zhujiang New Town, Guangzhou Women and Children's Medical Center, Huangpu Dadao and Huacheng Dadao metro stations. The mall portion under the Zhujiang New Town Central Park alone totals at least 150,000 square metres (1,610,000 sq ft) of commercial space.
  - In addition there are large subterranean retail tunnels that surround several Guangzhou Metro stations such as Tiyu Xilu, Tianhe Sports Center, Martyrs' Park, Guangzhou railway station and Guangzhou East railway station.
  - Smaller networks of subterranean retail tunnels surround several Guangzhou Metro stations such as Chen Clan Academy, Jiangnan West (江南新地商业街), Gongyuanqian
- Harbin has a number of large, multi-level underground shopping areas, originally built for air defense. The largest is at the roundabout intersection of Xida Zhi street and Hongjun street where three levels of markets following streets from four directions meet under the giant snowflake atrium.
- Hangzhou has an underground mall in Wulin Square connected to a subway station of the same name and nearby office buildings.
- Nanjing has an underground mall around Xinjiekou metro station.
- Qingdao has two small underground shopping areas, one at the head of the Zhanqiao (pier) and one west of the Qingdao guest house.
- Shanghai has a few underground networks, most notably at People's Square metro station, wherein the line 2 station has a second mezzanine full of shops and Line 1 is connected to a large underground shopping gallery at its south end. Shanghai Science Museum stop on line 2 has a large underground shopping area, known for its imitation goods. Huangpi Road South and Xujiahui stations are directly connected to shopping centers, and the Lujiazui station is connected to the Bank of China tower.
- Shenzhen has quite a few underground shopping malls:
  - The largest system is Link City (simplified Chinese: 连城新天地; traditional Chinese: 連城新天地), an underground shopping plaza connecting Convention and Exhibition Center, Shopping Park, Futian and Gangxia stations with surrounding office buildings. The initial sections of the mall used to be an air-raid shelter. In 2022, the network was expanded to Gangxia North station via the basement of the One Avenue mall.
  - An underground electronics market connecting Huaqiang Road, Huaqiang North and Huaxin stations and the surrounding Huaqiangbei electronics markets.
  - Smaller networks of subterranean retail tunnels surround several Shenzhen Metro stations such as Chegongmiao, Laojie, Science Museum, Luohu, Huangbeiling, Guiwan, Nanshan Book Mall, and Window of the World.
- Wuhan has a number of subterranean retail tunnels surrounding Wuhan Metro stations such as Zhongshan Park, Wuhan Business District, Wangjiawan, Qushuilou, Xudong, Wangjiadun, Hongshan Square and Changgang Road Stations.

=== Hong Kong ===
Many MTR stations in Hong Kong form extended underground networks connecting to adjacent buildings and at the basement of some major shopping malls in the area above. In addition, the stations themselves often house a number of retail shops.

Among such, the largest underground network consists of numerous out-of-system passageways within the station complex connecting the Tsim Sha Tsui–East Tsim Sha Tsui stations, government-owned pedestrian underpasses and basements of shopping malls, including the K11 Art Mall. In whole, the underground network spans almost the entirety of the retail heart of Tsim Sha Tsui, from Canton Road to the West and Chatham Road South to the East, and from Victoria Harbour to the South and Cameron Road to the North.

Previously, additional underground networks have been proposed for Causeway Bay in 2006 and in Kwun Tong under Hoi Yuen Road in 2010. As of 2014, studies are underway for underground networks in Tsim Sha Tsui, Kowloon Park, Victoria Park, Causeway Bay, Happy Valley, Admiralty, Wan Chai and Hong Kong Park. However, as of 2024, only the network in Tsim Sha Tsui had been built.

In 2017, The Development Bureau announced that two underground streets will be constructed in Kowloon City District, which would connect Kowloon City, San Po Kong, Kai Tak station and Sung Wong Toi station. The system would be known as Kai Tak Underground Shopping Street. As of 2025, the only portions constructed and operational are the basement portion of the AIRSIDE mall and the Cullinan Sky Mall, both of which connect to Kai Tak Station.

=== Iran ===
Historical underground cities of Persia include Samen and Nushabad.

- Kish: The island of Kish contains an ancient underground qanāt system now transformed into a tourist attraction.
- Tehran: Tehran has made a series of underground pathways in and around Vali-e Asr Metro Station and is in planning stage to increase commercial activity in newly built buildings in the central part of the city. The priorities for future development are expansion of underground connections around Haft-e Tir Metro Station and Meydan-e Vali-e Asr Metro Station.
- Isfahan: with the completion of Imam Hosein Metro Station, and Jahan Nama Complex, and their eventual underground connection, there would be an underground complex of a length of 300 m formed in Isfahan downtown area. Also, not underground per se, with Imam Ali Square's street network being dug underground and a large open space plaza being constructed on the top, the plaza is connected through a series of covered bazaar pathways of a length exceeding 4 km, connecting it to Naqsh-e Jahan Square.
- Nushabad: Nushabad has an underground city that served as a refuge during wars.

=== Japan ===
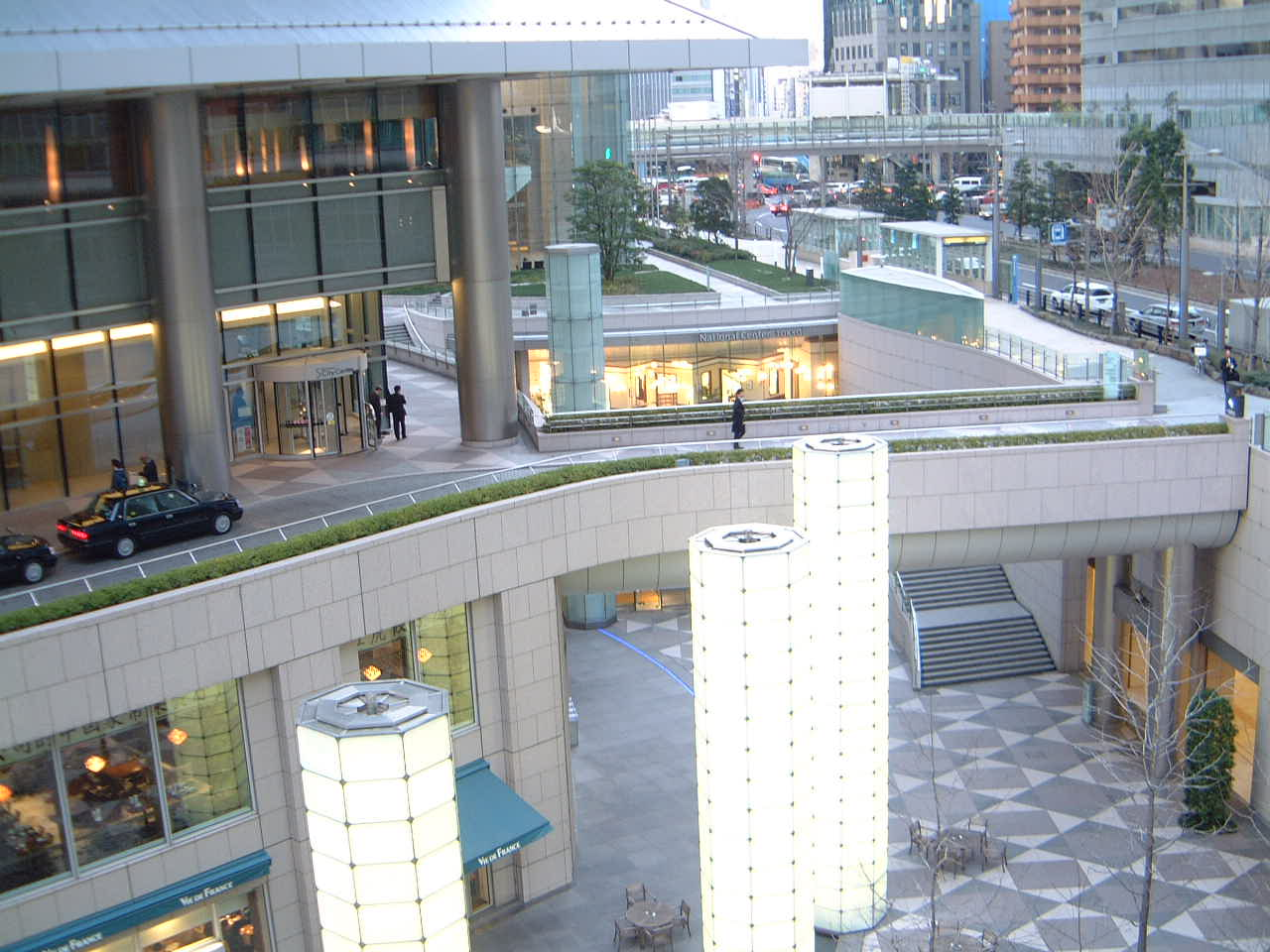
Shiodome City Center underground in Minato, Tokyo, Japan

- Sapporo, with its continental climate resulting in snowy winters, has a fairly large underground network in its central core spanning from Sapporo up to Susukino stations. The network also reaches Bus Center-Mae Station just within walking distance of Ōdōri Station.
- Osaka has enormous underground networks in the Umeda, Namba, and Shinsaibashi districts, in which Umeda alone includes over 1,200 retail stores and restaurants, as well as subway and intercity rail stations.
- Tokyo has numerous networks of connecting passages surrounding subway stations that span a few blocks for commuters. Stations such as Shinjuku and Shibuya have underground shopping malls. Shinjuku in particular has a reputation for being so large and complex that even local Japanese get lost there. The top five largest underground "cities" (地下街, chikagai) in Japan are all shopping districts:
  - Crysta Nagahori in Chūō-ku, Osaka – 81,765 m^{2} (880,111 sq ft)
  - Yaesu Chikagai in Chūō, Tokyo – 73,253 m^{2} (788,489 sq ft)
  - Kawasaki Azalea in Kawasaki-ku, Kawasaki – 56,704 m^{2} (610,357 sq ft)
  - Central Park Chikagai in Naka-ku, Nagoya – 56,370 m^{2} (606,762 sq ft)
  - Diamor Osaka in Kita-ku, Osaka – 42,977 m^{2} (462,601 sq ft)
- Kobe has an underground shopping mall called Duo Kobe that link JR West Kobe Station with Kōsoku Kōbe Station of Kobe Rapid Transit Railway and Harborland Station of Kobe Municipal Subway. Another such mall, called Metro Kobe, links Kōsoku Kōbe Station with Shinkaichi Station located underneath Kobe's old downtown area.
- Fukuoka has the Tenjin Chikagai (ja:天神地下街) underground mall which links Tenjin-Minami Station of Fukuoka City Subway Nanakuma Line with Tenjin Station of Fukuoka City Subway Airport Line and Nishitetsu Fukuoka (Tenjin) Station of Nishi-Nippon Railroad.

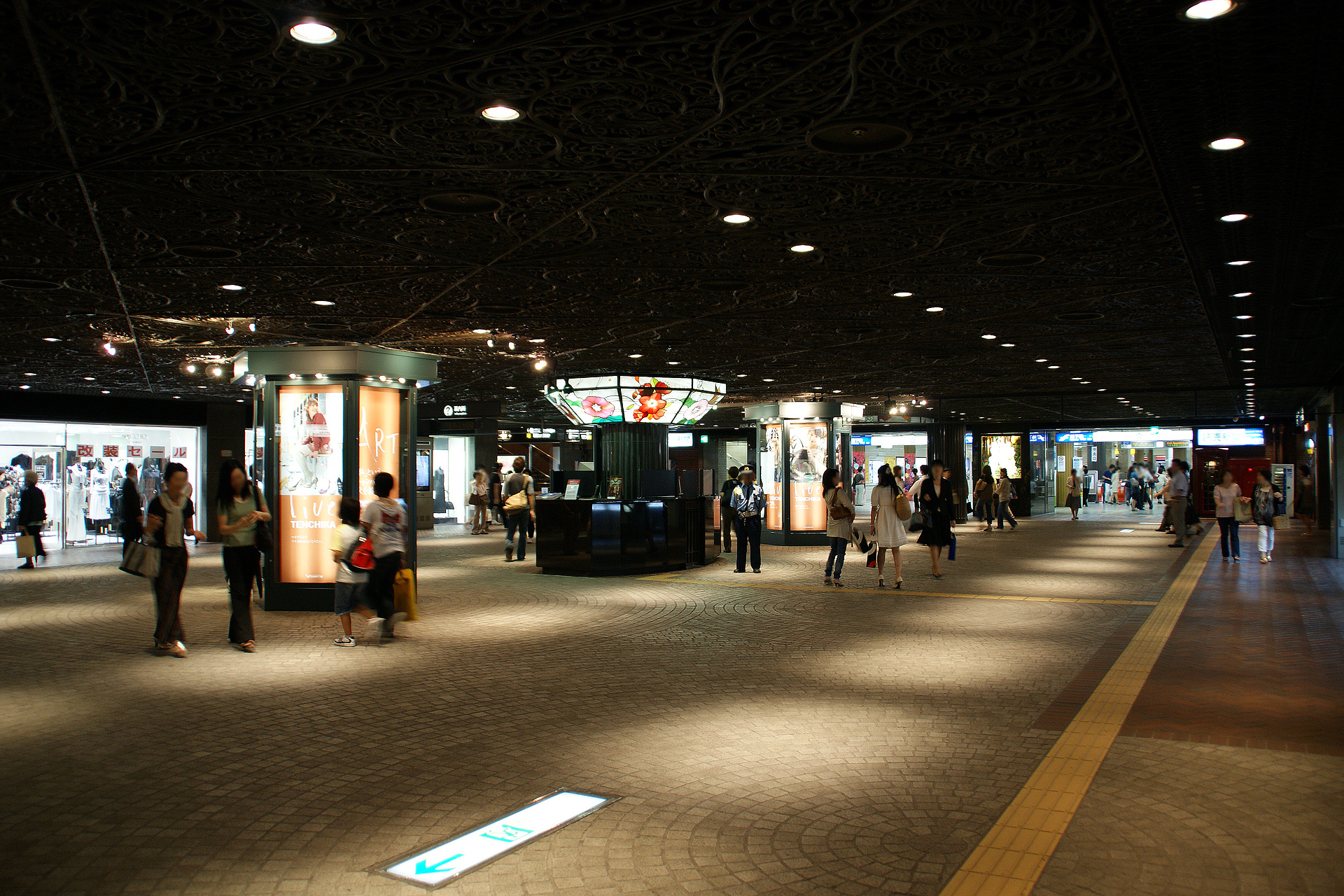
Tenjin Underground City in Chūō-ku, Fukuoka, Fukuoka Prefecture, Japan

=== Singapore ===
- Extensive underground networks exist around most major stations of the Mass Rapid Transit, such as the one at the Raffles Place MRT station with direct underground connections to 19 buildings in the busy Raffles Place area. Expanding the network is the first phase of a new subterranean network linking the station to the One Raffles Quay and Marina Bay Financial Centre for a complex underground pedestrian network across the entire downtown area.
- The CityLink Mall offers over 60,000 square feet (5,600 m^{2}) of underground retail space and connects the City Hall MRT station with Suntec City, the Esplanade - Theatres on the Bay, and other developments in the Marina Centre area. It is also linked to the Esplanade MRT station on the Circle MRT line.
- The Orchard Road shopping belt is connected by underground linkways often with commercial space, particularly around the three MRT stations serving the district, namely Orchard, Somerset and Dhoby Ghaut. However, the underground network around the three stations do not connect. Plans are also in place to link towards Bras Basah Road into Suntec City, Bugis Junction and Chinatown.

=== South Korea ===
- Seoul has a well-developed underground network. Myeongdong and Hoehyeon underground streets are the most famous; they are connected to Hoehyeon Station and Myeongdong Station
- It is planned to build a larger underground city in Gangnamdaero, the border between Gangnam District and Seocho District.

=== Taiwan ===
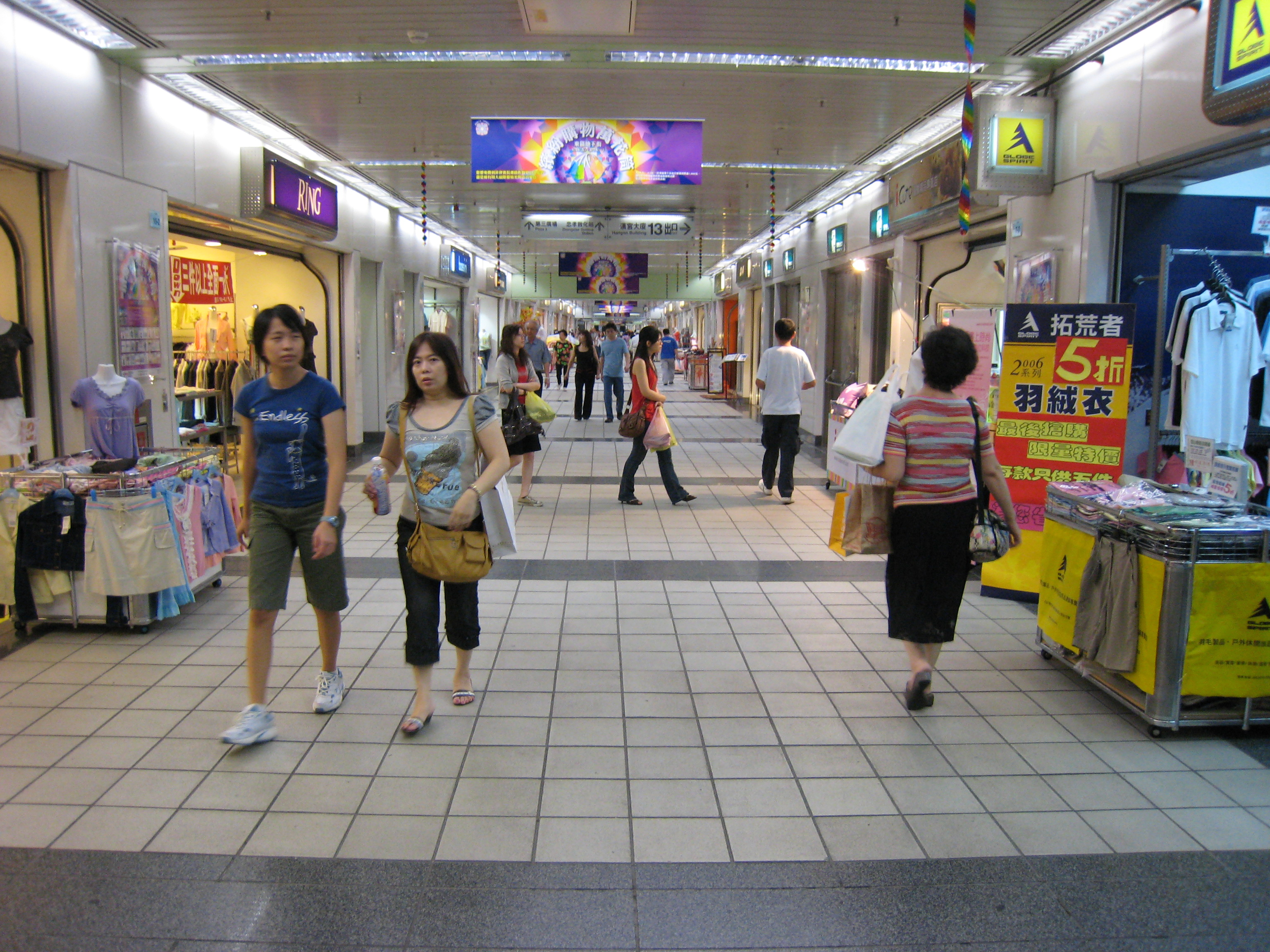
An underground mall in Taipei connecting two Taipei Metro stations

Taipei has two major underground streets connecting two or more metro stations. In addition, there is a large underground shopping mall near the main train station.

Major underground streets that connects multiple metro stations：

- Underground streets around Taipei Station (Chinese: 台北地下街): Taipei City Mall, Zhongshan Metro Mall, Station Front Metro Mall, K Underground Mall, Eslite underground malls, etc. The whole complex spans 3 metro stops: Beimen, Taipei Main Station, Zhongshan, and Shuanglian stations.
- East Metro Mall (Chinese: 東區地下街), situated between Zhongxiao Fuxing and Zhongxiao Dunhua metro stations.

Minor underground streets that connects to a single metro station:

- Ximen Metro Mall (Chinese: 西門地下街), connected to Ximen station.
- Longshan Temple Underground Shopping Mall (Chinese: 龍山寺地下街), next to Longshan Temple metro station

Kaohsiung used to host the first underground mall in Taiwan. Opened in 1978, the Kaohsiung underground mall suffered a fire on 18 December 1989, and the underground mall had been closed to public ever since.

=== Turkey ===
- Cappadocia contains several historical underground cities carved out of unusual geological formations formed via the eruptions of ancient volcanoes. The cities were initially inhabited by the Hittites, then later by early Christians as hiding places. They are now archeological and tourist sites but are not generally occupied (see Kaymakli Underground City, Derinkuyu underground city, Özkonak Underground City, Mazı Underground City). The latest large underground city was discovered in 2007 in Gaziemir, Güzelyurt. It was a stopover on the Silk Road, allowing travelers and their camels to rest in safety underground, in a 'fortress' equivalent to a modern hotel.

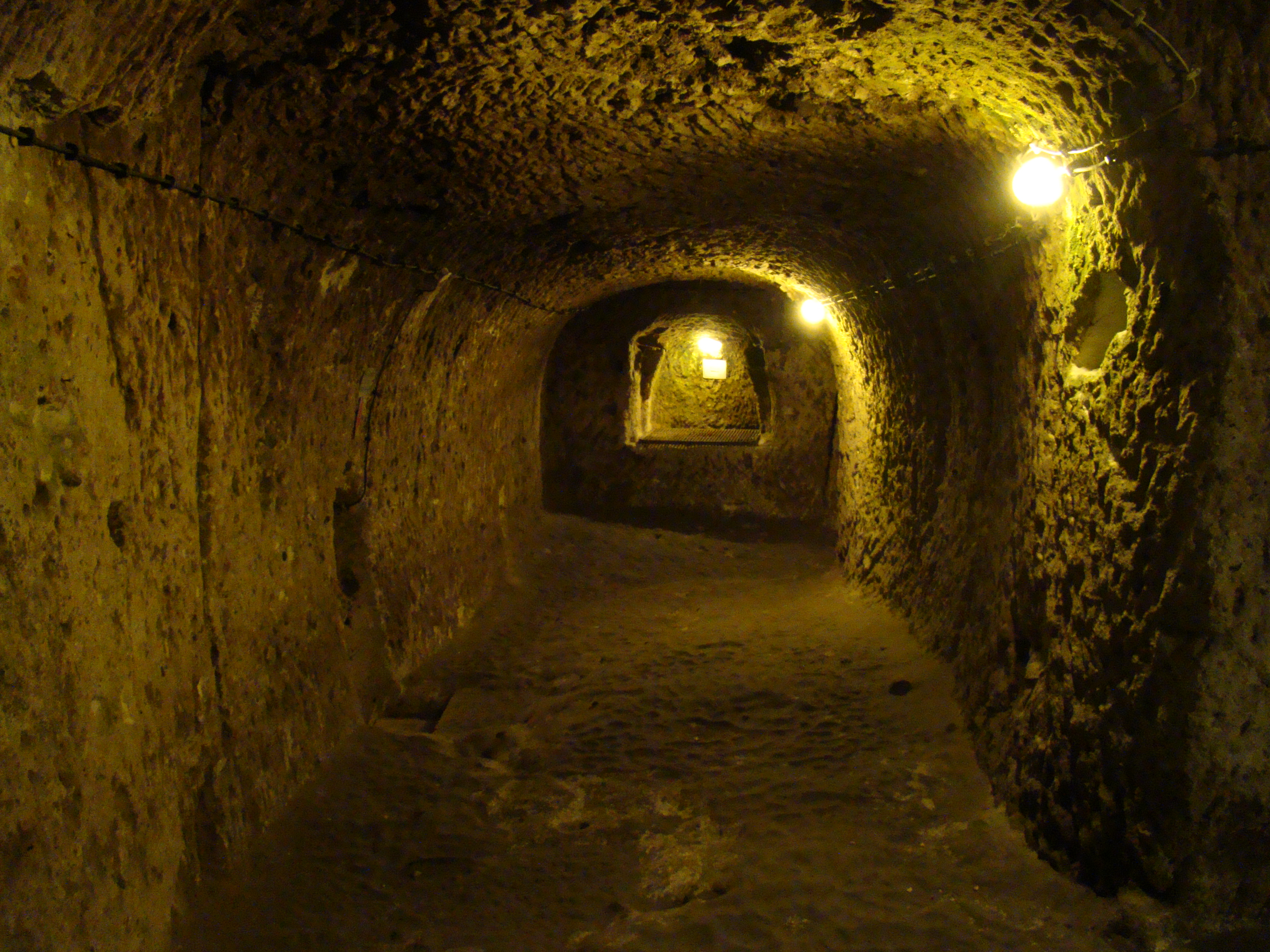
A typical view from inside the underground city in Derinkuyu, one of the largest underground complexes in Cappadocia. There are few artifacts left from the original builders, mainly just large rocks that were used to block the passage for intruders. Most of the "cities" are corridors, but some places there are rooms large enough to live in, and some rooms that have the cross-like shape of a church, which is probably exactly what they were.

- Istanbul has Roman-era cisterns, built 2,000 years ago for water storage. It is now a tourist attraction.

== Australia ==
Sydney has a series of underground shopping malls around the Town Hall underground station. The tunnels run south to the George Street cinema district, west under the town hall, and north to Pitt Street Mall through the Queen Victoria Building. The northern branch links Queen Victoria Building with Galleries Victoria, Sydney Central Plaza (which in turn links underground to Westfield Sydney and internally above ground to Centrepoint, Imperial Arcade, Skygarden, Glasshouse and 25 Martin Place). The linked centres run for over 3 km (1.9 mi). In 2005, Westfield Corporation submitted a development application to link Sydney Central Plaza underground with 3 other properties on Pitt Street Mall and extend the tunnel network by a further 500 m (1,640 ft) or more.

Perth has a small network of underground shopping malls running from the St Georges Terrace entrance to Trinity Arcade to Murray Street Mall.

The small town of Coober Pedy in northern South Australia has numerous underground residences and other facilities. The area was and is extensively mined for opal, and the settlers lived underground to escape the scorching daytime heat, often exceeding 40 °C (104 °F).

Melbourne is said to have the largest underground tunnel system in the world spanning over 1,500 km (930 mi), with the clandestine group known as the Cave Clan who meet regularly to explore, vandalise, socialise and map out this network. The vast majority of these tunnels are decommissioned or for stormwater purposes.

== Europe ==
=== Bosnia and Herzegovina ===
- Skenderija is a cultural, sports and trade center located in Sarajevo, Bosnia and Herzegovina. In the area of 70,000 square meters there are multipurpose halls for various sports, concert and cultural venues, and trade areas above ground including square. Underground is a modern shopping center "Privredni grad" (English: Commercial City) with numerous confectionery shops, restaurants, coffee bars and other spaces.
- The Sarajevo Tunnel (Serbo-Croatian: Sarajevski tunel / Сарајевски тунел), also known as Tunel spasa (Тунел спаса, English: Tunnel of salvation) and Tunnel of Hope, was a tunnel constructed between March and June 1993 during the Siege of Sarajevo in the midst of the Bosnian War.

=== Croatia ===
- Cellars of Diocletian's Palace, sometimes referred to as the "basement halls", is a set of substructures, located at the southern end of Diocletian's Palace (now the southernmost part of Split Stari grade), that once held up the private apartments of Emperor Diocletian and represent one of the best preserved ancient complexes of their kind in the world.

=== Czech Republic ===
- Znojmo has a vast labyrinth of underground passageways and cellars known as the Znojmo Catacombs. They were originally developed for defensive purposes.

=== Finland ===
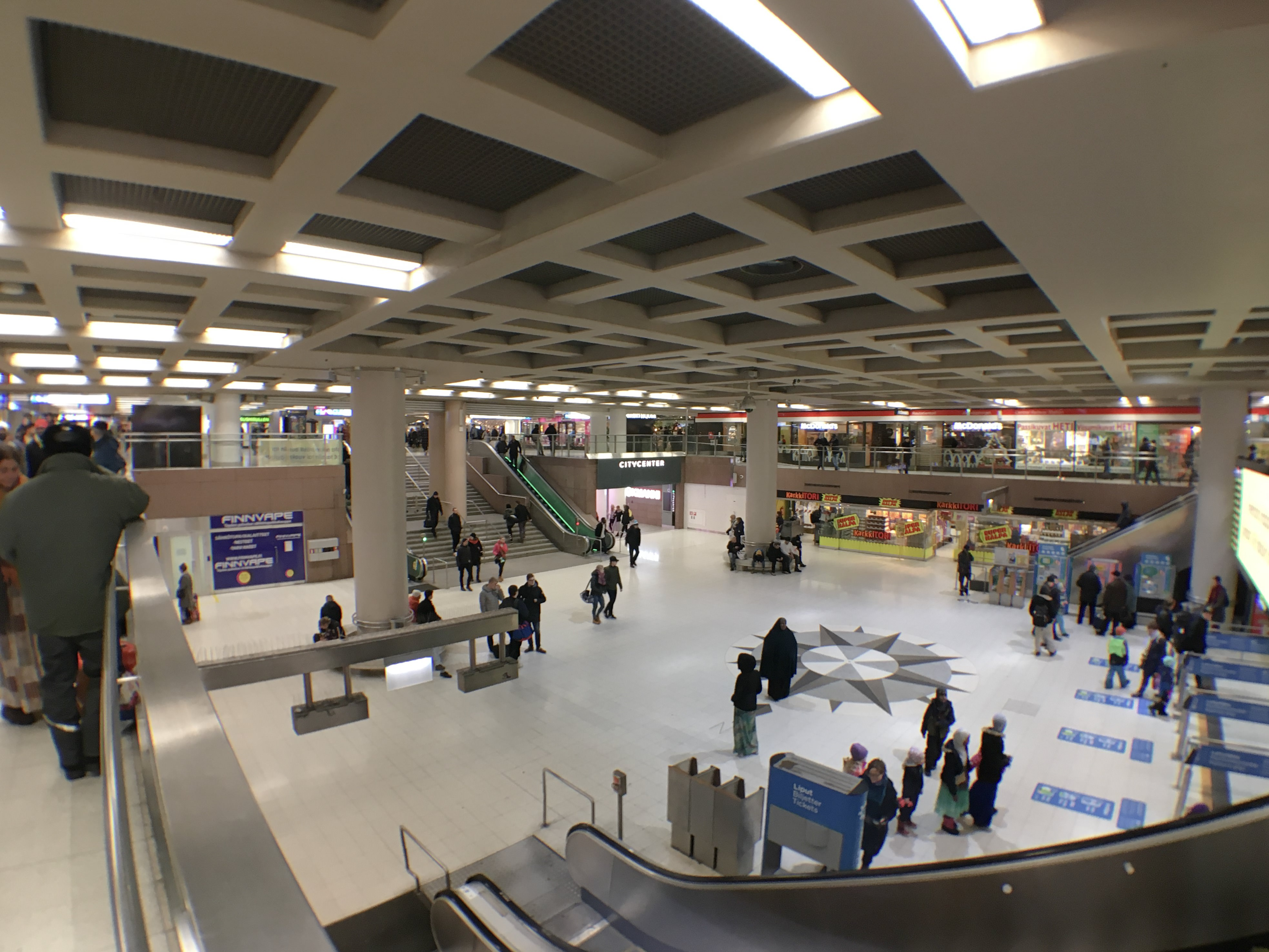
A "compass square" of Asematunneli, an underground shopping center near the Helsinki Central railway station

- In Helsinki centre, underground shopping areas cover the central railway station area including the underground shopping centre Asematunneli, and two subway stations, Rautatientori and Kamppi. The Kamppi metro station is integrated with the Kamppi Center (55,000 m^{2} (592,015 sq ft)) long-distance bus terminal, freight depot and internal parking area, all underground. It features a six-storey shopping complex and a central bus terminal for local buses. Together with these, the Forum shopping centre, Sokos and Stockmann department stores are all connected together with underground walkways featuring shops and other services.
- Three other subway stations in Helsinki have similar, smaller undergrounds: Hakaniemi, Sörnäinen and University of Helsinki.
- The master plan of Helsinki's large underground city complex is known to be the only one of its kind in the world.

=== France ===
- Paris:
  - The mines of Paris are several disconnected networks of more than 300 km (186 mi) of mining tunnels started in the 13th century and dominated by the "large south network" on the Left Bank, of which 1.7 km (1 mi) was repurposed from 1786 as the Catacombs of Paris ossuary, the final resting place of 6–7 million Parisians. Other parts of the tunnel network have long been closed off for safety reasons, but the tunnels have served as safe passageways during war and revolution, routes for urban explorers, and venues for unauthorized cultural activities.
  - La Défense, the major business district northwest of the city center built in the 1960s, has an extensive network of commercial passageways under a vast plaza centered on the Gare de La Défense and radiating out to connect with surrounding buildings, notably the large Les Quatre Temps shopping center and CNIT, but enabling access to many buildings of the district.
  - The Forum des Halles is a partially underground multilevel commercial and shopping center connected to the massive underground transit hub Chatelet-Les-Halles. Opened in 1979, passageways extend west under the Jardin Nelson Mandela for several city blocks, and within the fare zone of the Paris Metro, stretch half a kilometer south to the banks of the River Seine.
- Naours: 33 metres (108 ft) below the Picardy village of Naours (between Doullens and Amiens), the 28 galleries (2,000 metres (6,562 ft) long) of an ancient limestone quarry (exploited since the 3rd century c.e.) have long been used as shelter by the population seeking refuge from invaders. Occupied by the Triple Entente forces during WWI, and then used as headquarters by the German Army during the WWII occupation of France, the galleries are now open to visitors.
- Arras: during World War I, the French and British Army built a tunnel system (boves) based upon the already existing adits from a formerly used quarry. Scots and Englishmen used the quarry below the quarter Saint-Sauveur and called it "Glasgow", "Manchester" and "Liverpool". The New Zealand Army (bonded with the British Army) used the quarry for constructing another tunnel system below the quarter Ronville and called it "Wellington", "Auckland" and "Nelson". Soldiers from these armed forces hid in the tunnels for several days. On April 9, 1917, 5:30 am, 24,000 soldiers sortied from there to encounter German troops.

=== Germany ===
- Berlin: several buildings on the east side of Friedrichstraße, from Quartier 205 (Friedrichstraße 70) northwards up to Galerie Lafayette are connected to each other. Businesses are on both sides of the underground street so that it appears to be inside a building all the time, even when it crosses Taubenstraße underground.

Extensive underground bunkers still exist all throughout the city centre, although they are largely sealed off and closed to the public.

All of the buildings at the large Charité Virchow campus are connected via a system of spacious tunnels. In addition to employee use, particularly during inclement weather, there is also a rudimentary robotic system via which mail and packages are delivered across campus.

- Frankfurt am Main: underground shopping malls, called 'B-Ebene' in Frankfurt, of considerable size are found at Hauptbahnhof (central station) and Hauptwache.
- Hamburg: the Jungfernstieg and Rathaus subway stations and several entrances are connected by pedestrian tunnels, some of them contain shops. There is a direct access to the Europapassage shopping mall.
- Munich: underground shopping mall at Karlsplatz/Stachus. This combines the underpass that leads to the pedestrian area and the entry to the subway system.
- Stuttgart: there is a large underground shopping mall (Klettpassage) connecting the Hauptbahnhof (central station) with the main shopping street, the Königstraße.

=== Greece ===
In Thessaloniki, Hellenistic, Roman, Byzantine, and Ottoman monuments coexist underground and several of these have been discovered and merged. Monuments such as the Catacombs of St. John and the underground museum of the Agora have limited access and many are not permitted to enter even to the locals by the Archaeological Department of the Thessaloniki underground Metro project.

=== Hungary ===
- Budapest has an extensive network of underground spaces known as the Kőbánya cellar system.

=== Italy ===
- Ancient Rome had a network of catacombs, ancient Jewish and Christian underground burial places near the city.
- Naples has many chambers and tunnels beneath the city, including channels and reservoirs for water, and catacombs.

=== Netherlands ===
In general, many large railway stations house underground hallways featuring shops, restaurants, banks and money exchange offices. A striking example of such stations would be the main hallway of the Amsterdam central station, which connects to the city's metro system, although due to renovation and re-building it was temporarily (2012–2015) not possible to walk from the subway to the train station without going outside.

- Maastricht: originally a casemate, the kazematten of Maastricht form a 14 km (9 mi) long network of tunnels underneath the western part of the city. This tunnel network has mainly been used for military purposes. The main construction period of these tunnels lasted from 1575 to 1825. The newest sections of the tunnel network were dug as late as the middle 20th century, built in the Cold War as a shelter for citizens in the event of a nuclear strike on the city.
- Caves of Maastricht are a far more extensive, system of tunnels with a length over 200 km (124 mi) and 20,000 individual corridors lies just west of Maastricht; (Dutch: Grotten van Maastricht). These man-made 'caves' were used as Marl quarries from the 13th century onwards. In World War II, these caves were used to hide large quantities of paintings from the Germans, even including the Nachtwacht. In 1944, construction started on a large public shelter that could have housed 45,000 persons in these caves. The project never saw its completion due to the liberation of Maastricht in the fall of the same year.

=== Poland ===
- Warsaw: Warszawa Centralna railway station is connected by pedestrian tunnels to adjacent rail stations Warszawa Śródmieście and Warszawa WKD, Złote Tarasy shopping center, and the Centrum LIM skyscraper.

=== Russia ===
- Moscow: "Okhotnyi Ryad" (Охотный Ряд) is a four-level underground shopping mall (29,000 m^{2} (312,153 sq ft)) linked to Metro station of same name.
- Moscow Metro 2 is a purported secret underground metro system in Moscow built supposedly during (or from) the time of Joseph Stalin.

=== Spain ===
- In Barcelona, there is an abandoned underground mall near Plaça de Catalunya called Avinguda de la Llum, closed since 1990, which had originally been part of a more ambitious project to build an underground city under the centre of Barcelona. Also, some Metro stations or connecting lines in the same station are connected by underground passages over a block in length.
- Legend has that the many caves and tunnels in Subterranean Toledo under the old part of Toledo were connected and were used by occultists.

=== Sweden ===
- By walking through Stockholm subway stations and indoor shopping malls it is possible to walk indoor through the central business district, partly underground, from Arsenalsgatan subway entrance (Kungsträdgården station) to Kungsbron (north entrance to Cityterminalen bus terminal), covering a distance of between 1 and 2 kilometres.

=== Switzerland ===
- Geneva contains a large underground shopping centre which also acts to connect separate sections of surface shops.
- St. Gallen's main hospital uses several tunnels to connect its buildings, helicopter pad, pharmacies and storage facilities.
- Zürich Hauptbahnhof in Zürich has an underground RailCity shopping mall with full access to the station platforms.

=== Ukraine ===
- Kyiv: an underground concourse extends underneath Khreschatyk Street from Maidan Nezalezhnosti to Ploshcha Ukrainskykh Heroiv. The concourse connects to the Kyiv Metro and to the Globe shopping mall beneath Maidan Nezalezhnosti.
- Odesa: a ramified tunnel network made from the former quarries that is famous as Odesa Catacombs covers the historical center of Odesa and some suburban areas.

=== United Kingdom ===
- London:
  - There are extensive rooms, tunnels and chambers known as the Churchill War Rooms and the Admiralty Citadel beneath Whitehall, which were created during World War II, when they were used by Winston Churchill.
  - In the redeveloped docklands area, Canary Wharf tube station is connected underground with adjacent office towers and shopping malls. It is also possible to access two stations of the Docklands Light Railway without going outside.
  - There are many other underground structures in London, reflecting two millennia of human habitation.
- Edinburgh's old town has extensive rooms, tunnels and chambers beneath some areas; of particular note are the Edinburgh Vaults, where overcrowding led people to construct elaborately interconnected buildings in the vaults of the city's South Bridge. There is also a street named Mary King's Close, which was built over in 1753, and is now preserved and open to visitors.
- Corsham is the location of the Central Government War Headquarters, code name 'Burlington'. Built in the late 1950s in response to the increasing threat of nuclear warfare during the Cold War, the 35 acres (14 ha) subterranean site was designed to be the main emergency government war headquarters of the UK outside London and safely house up to 4,000 central government personnel in the event of a nuclear strike.
- Dover contains a series of interconnecting tunnels, that honeycomb both sides of the Dover Valley, carved into the chalk cliffs. These date from ancient times at Dover Castle through to Napoleonic, Second World War and Cold War installations. The Dover Castle complex is the larger, going at least six levels deep and includes a hospital, troop quarters, offices, storage and channel view points. The southern tunnels are mixed between Napoleonic War-era defences, such as the Dover Western Heights, and Second World War-era defences, with some seafront air raid shelters still used for shop storage today. Some have fallen into disrepair and are now closed to the public, but many are still open.
- In Liverpool, the Williamson Tunnels included the site of an 'underground house' complete with windows (concealed by work for public opening), and an extant and partially excavated 'banqueting hall'.
- Nottingham has an extensive network of man-made caves, dating back to the Early Middle Ages.
- In Southport, Nevill Street has the remainders of an underground shopping street, which can now only be accessed from the cellars of buildings on the current street, which was raised by one storey from the original level. One end of the underground street ended at the Marine Lake, close to the pier entrance.
- There are extensive underground constructions across Britain, such as Chislehurst Caves, built or repurposed as air-raid shelters during World War II.

== North America ==
=== Canada ===
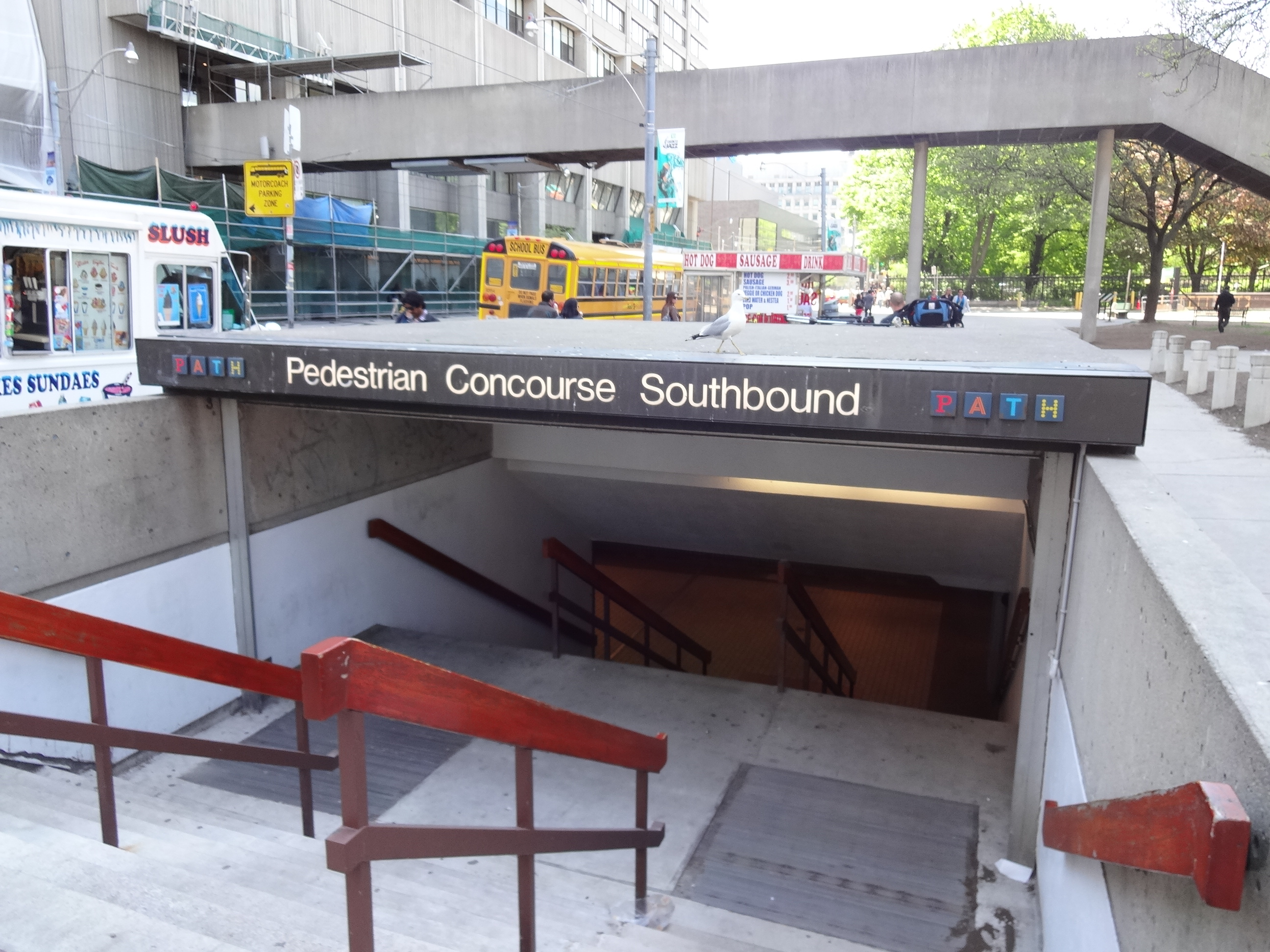
PATH entrance, Toronto, Ontario

The cold-winter northern continental climate of much of Canada makes underground pedestrian malls particularly useful in many cities.

- University of Calgary in Calgary, Alberta, has a small system of tunnels and at-ground and above ground ways. It connects almost all buildings on Campus.
- Charlottetown, Prince Edward Island, has a tiny system. A pedestrian tunnel connects the Confederation Center of the Arts with the Confederation Court Mall. The mall also connects to The Holman Grand Hotel. The Mall is separated into a main section and a much smaller section connected by an overground walkway. This small section of the mall connects to a 338 spot parking garage, which itself connects to the Homburg Financial Building, and has a separate public entry. Apart from the hotel, two additional office buildings are on top and can be assessed through the mall, a building owned by National Bank, and a building owned by BDC.
- Edmonton, Alberta, has a small system of tunnels and above-ground skyways called the Pedway connecting buildings and LRT stations of the downtown core.
- Halifax, Nova Scotia (Downtown Halifax Link), where no point is more than 10 minutes casual walking distance from any other one.
- Montreal, Quebec, RÉSO, Underground City, or la ville souterraine in French, is the largest habitable underground network in the world. Its 32 km (20 mi) of tunnel cover more than 41 city blocks (about 12 km^{2} (5 sq mi)). Access through the RÉSO can be made to apartment buildings, hotels, offices, banks, and universities, as well as public spaces like retail shops and malls, concert halls, cinemas, the Bell Centre hockey arena, museums, eight metro stations, two train stations (Lucien-L'Allier and Gare Centrale), a bus terminal (Réseau de transport de Longueuil and other transit authorities), and other areas. It connects 80% of office space and 35% of commercial space in downtown Montreal.
  - The network began as a connection between Place Ville Marie, the Queen Elizabeth Hotel and the Gare Centrale.
  - More than 2,000 shops and 40 cinemas line the passageways. Tourists often visit attractions in the underground city, which is used by an average of half a million Montrealers per day.
  - Eight metro stations link to smaller networks that are not yet part of the central network, such as Berri–UQAM in the eastern part of downtown and Pie-IX which links venues from the 1976 Summer Olympics.
- Carleton University in Ottawa, Ontario, has a 5-kilometre (3.1 mi) tunnel network which connects ten residence buildings with other buildings on its main campus.
  - The city also has an underground concourse at the Place de Ville office complex in the downtown business district, connecting 4 office buildings containing over 1,000,000 square feet (93,000 m^{2}) of leasable space, and 2 hotels with 900 rooms combined. There are plans to expand the underground network after the Confederation Line, a light rail line featuring three downtown subway stations, is completed. It is estimated there will be as many as 20 buildings with direct indoor connections to the downtown subway portion, or 4 million square feet of office space, 1,800,000 square feet (170,000 m^{2}) of retail, 1400 hotel rooms and the Ottawa Convention Centre.
- Saskatoon, Saskatchewan – On the campus of the University of Saskatchewan a tunnel system connects several of the buildings on campus, this is augmented with overhead walkways that further extend the network.
- St. John's, Newfoundland and Labrador – At the main campus of Memorial University of Newfoundland are the MUNnels, a tunnel system, in which all the main buildings are connected, though there are also some elevated walkways.
- Toronto, Ontario ("PATH"), comprises 29 kilometres (18 mi) of walkways and 1,200 shops. It links many important buildings and attractions downtown to six TTC subway stations. PATH accommodates 100,000 pedestrians daily, and PATH businesses host the world's largest underground sidewalk sale once annually.
  - The PATH network in Toronto is the largest underground shopping complex in the world with 371,600 square metres (4,000,000 sq ft).
  - Toronto also has a separate, smaller "underground city" connecting several building complexes and two subway stations on Bloor Street.
- Vancouver, British Columbia, has two shopping malls, Pacific Centre and Vancouver Centre, containing more than 200 stores, that extend over three city blocks, with interconnections that weave above and below ground level. These malls have metro access at Granville SkyTrain Station on the Expo Line and Vancouver City Centre SkyTrain Station on the Canada Line. There are also restricted tunnels and underground parking spaces that connect Pacific Centre to Robson Square and the Courthouse building. Other SkyTrain stations similarly connect with surrounding buildings: Burrard Station with Bentall Centre and Royal Centre, and Waterfront Station with Canada Place and the Sinclair Centre.
- Whiteshell Laboratories, in Pinawa, Manitoba, had tunnels from the Services and Control Centre to the Technical Information Centre, and to the Engineering and Administration building and Cafeteria. (Over-land passages connected the library with the R&D Centre and the reactor building.) The tunnels allowed staff to move about the site without outdoor clothing. They also served as safe passages in case of atmospheric release of radioactive material.
- Winnipeg, Manitoba, has a smaller (mainly commercial office) area located underground in the downtown core below Portage and Main. Several of the downtown office towers have subterranean entrances to the complex allowing employees and visitors to bypass the downtown traffic and avoid the cold winter temperatures Winnipeg regularly experiences. The system links with the skyway system known as the Winnipeg Walkway. Also the University of Manitoba has tunnels for the students to travel from building to building.

=== United States ===
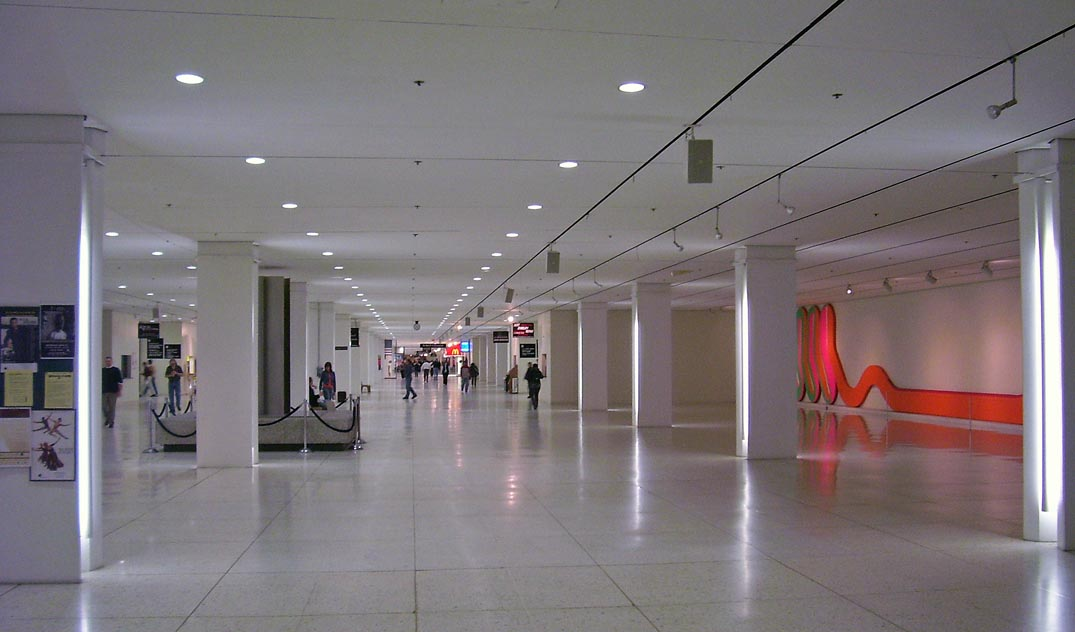
Underground passage of the Empire State Plaza, featuring a collection of large-scale abstract modern art

- Albany, New York: the Empire State Plaza features an underground city which contains banks, a YMCA, restaurants, several food courts, retailers, a police station, a bus station, and a Visitor Center. The Plaza connects several government buildings to the Egg (a state-owned theater), the New York State Museum, the New York State Library, the Corning Tower, legislative offices, judicial offices, and the Times Union Center. The Empire State Plaza Art Collection consists of 92 large-scale paintings, sculptures, and tapestries at various locations along the main corridor, and features works from the New York School of abstract modern art from the 1960s and 1970s.
- Atlanta, Georgia: the "Underground" represents the original surface level of downtown Atlanta; the present streets are raised roadways (viaducts) built in the 1920s. The shopping center Underground Atlanta, taking advantage of the former street-level storefronts, covers six city blocks and includes retail shopping and restaurants. It was begun in 1968 and re-opened in 1989 after a financially forced closure.
- Boise, Idaho: the downtown sector's Capitol Mall Complex consists of a large system of networked tunnels that connect all the state buildings. The tunnels have walkways and vehicle passageways. The underground area boasts a geothermal power plant, a banking system, extensive dining areas, parking, a dedicated mail room for the Capitol Mall Complex and a fallout shelter. The main hall is decorated with art from local artists that was collected over a thirty-year time frame. This collection is not often seen by the public as access is limited. Recent remodeling of the Idaho State Capitol Building has added new underground wings that are linked to the Capitol Mall. These new wings have offices, meeting rooms, and records storage areas and were designed to support the Idaho legislature when it is in session.
- Boston, Massachusetts:
  - Northeastern University has a tunnel network linking thirteen buildings in the center of campus.
  - Harvard Business School in Allston has a color-coded basement tunnel system open to pedestrian traffic.
- Cambridge, Massachusetts: many of the older buildings of the Massachusetts Institute of Technology between Massachusetts Avenue and Ames Street are linked together by underground utility tunnels.
- Chicago, Illinois: the Chicago Pedway consists of approximately 4 disjointed tunnel systems, the largest covering about 10 blocks, connecting such buildings and transit stations as Metra's Millennium Station, the Chicago Cultural Center, the Macy's (former Marshall Field's) store at State and Randolph, Chicago Transit Authority's State Street and Dearborn Street subway stations, City Hall, and the James R. Thompson Center, along with few residential buildings including Aqua, Columbus Plaza, The Heritage at Millennium Park, the Park Millennium and 200 North Dearborn Apartments.
- Cleveland, Ohio: the Tower City Center, on the public square at the center of downtown Cleveland, houses a shopping mall with a food court, two hotels, and the Tower City Rapid Transit Station, the central station on RTA's Red, Green, and Blue Lines. The building connects to several office buildings, and also has an enclosed skyway to the Gateway Sports and Entertainment Complex.
- Crystal City, Virginia: a residential and commercial area of Arlington County, Virginia next to the Ronald Reagan Washington National Airport, The place features the Crystal City Underground an extensive underground city connecting its hotels, office buildings, and apartment tower. It used to have 173 shops, restaurants, banks, medical, and other services.
- Dallas, Texas: the Dallas Pedestrian Network has a network of tunnels connecting buildings in the downtown area.
- Dayton, Ohio: the academic section of Wright State University's campus contains nearly two miles (3.18 kilometers) of tunnels that link 20 of the 22 buildings. The tunnels were designed to connect the campus without imprinting the surrounding land.
- Detroit, Michigan: the Fisher Building, located in New Center, features an underground concourse which connects with the Albert Kahn Building, New Center One, and Cadillac Place (formerly the General Motors Building) via a series of skyways and tunnels.
- Duluth, Minnesota: the city's downtown sector has an extensive network of skyways and tunnels connecting its buildings, including the Federal Courthouse and Convention Center (DECC).
- Havre, Montana: the city has an underground area, called "Havre Beneath the Streets", that operates as a tourist attraction.
- Houston, Texas: the seven-mile (11 km) Houston tunnel system is set about twenty feet below Houston's downtown street system and is composed of underground passageways which, with above-ground skywalks, link office towers to hotels, banks, corporate and government offices, restaurants, retail stores, and the Houston Theater District. Only one building, Wells Fargo Plaza, offers direct access from the street to the Tunnel; otherwise, the Tunnel can only be entered via street-level stairs, escalators, or elevators inside a building connected to it.
- Irvine, California: a network of large tunnels running beneath the University of California, Irvine connects many of the campus' major buildings to a central utility plant. These tunnels are only accessible to maintenance staff, although there are also publicly accessible tunnels which intersect the utility tunnels, such as the one that goes between the main Information & Computer Science building and the Engineering Tower.
- Kansas City, Missouri: the city's SubTropolis is a 55,000,000 square foot (5,060,000 m^{3}), 1,100-acre (4.5 km^{2}) underground business complex running along the Missouri River. The space was originally part of the Bethany Falls limestone mine, and was later repurposed for use as a commercial underground storage facility.
- Lowell, Massachusetts: At University of Massachusetts Lowell's North Campus, there is an underground pedestrian and utility tunnel system connecting multiple buildings.
- Minneapolis and Saint Paul, Minnesota: there are three major systems consisting mostly of above-ground skyways in the Twin Cities. The Minneapolis Skyway System covers approximately 11 miles with 62 skyways. St. Paul's skyway system connects buildings in a 30-block radius in the downtown core. On the University of Minnesota Minneapolis and St Paul campuses, the Gopher Way connects most buildings and parking structures together using a number of skyway links and tunnels. A system of tunnels connects state office buildings around the Minnesota State Capitol. A series of tunnels also connect the Hennepin County Government Center, Minneapolis City Hall, and the United States District Court for the District of Minnesota.
- New York City, New York: several New York City Subway stations have direct access to one or more buildings. Additionally, most of the lower floor of the Rockefeller Center qualifies as an underground city, as it features connections to subways, an extensive underground concourse, building connections, and several restaurants, all below ground. The area around Times Square and the Port Authority Bus Terminal forms an underground network several blocks in size; much of it is within the New York City Subway's fare control. A series of tunnels connect Brookfield Place (New York City) through the World Trade Center's lower levels, to the Fulton Center, forming an underground city with several subway stations and many shops and restaurants.
- Oklahoma City, Oklahoma: the Oklahoma City Underground (formerly the Oklahoma City Conncourse) is a tunnel system connecting nearly all of the downtown buildings in a 20-square-block area. It is one of the most extensive all-enclosed pedestrian systems in the U.S., extending three-quarters of a mile and connecting over 30 downtown buildings via tunnels or skyways. The original tunnel link was built in 1931 and the system was extended in the 1970s. It underwent a $2 million renovation in 2006–2007, after which the Conncourse was renamed the Underground.
- Philadelphia, Pennsylvania: Center City has several miles of interconnected underground concourses under Market, Broad, and Locust Streets, and JFK Boulevard. The system includes nine rapid transit and regional rail stations served by 23 SEPTA and PATCO lines, and the lower levels of several shopping centers. It is also connected to the lower levels of many office buildings and several department stores and hotels, as well as the customer service counters of the Municipal Services Building. A branch of the US Post Office is located in the Suburban Station section of the concourse.
- Portland, Oregon: there is a group of connected tunnels from the 19th century known as the Old Portland Underground or Shanghai tunnels.
- Richmond, Virginia: there are a series of connected tunnels between state government buildings in the city of Richmond. Certain passageways are locked off but a good portion of the tunnels are accessible from buildings. The purpose of the tunnels is not generally known; the two most common explanations are that they were built to allow people to move between buildings in inclement weather or that they were built as part of an emergency evacuation plan.
- Rochester, Minnesota: the Mayo Clinic's buildings in the downtown area are interconnected with tunnels and skyways. Other businesses are along the corridors, including a number of hotels that often house clinic patients. It is often called a subway, although there are no underground rails in the city.
- Rochester, New York: Nazareth College in the southeast portion of Rochester has an extensive underground network of tunnels leading from the dormitories to the major buildings on campus. Rochester Institute of Technology has two tunnel networks linking its residence halls, and its academic buildings, but the two networks are unconnected. The University of Rochester has an underground network connecting many of its academic buildings.
- Seattle, Washington: several modern undergrounds and a historical tour exist. The Westlake Center shopping mall and its surrounding department stores have underground entrances to the mezzanine level of the Westlake light rail station in the Downtown Seattle Transit Tunnel. Another substantial corridor extends from Two Union Square to Rainier Square, with connections to hotels, the 5th Avenue Theatre, and many retail shops along the way. The Seattle Underground Tour in Pioneer Square takes visitors on a humorous guided walk showing the original ground level of many buildings in that area.

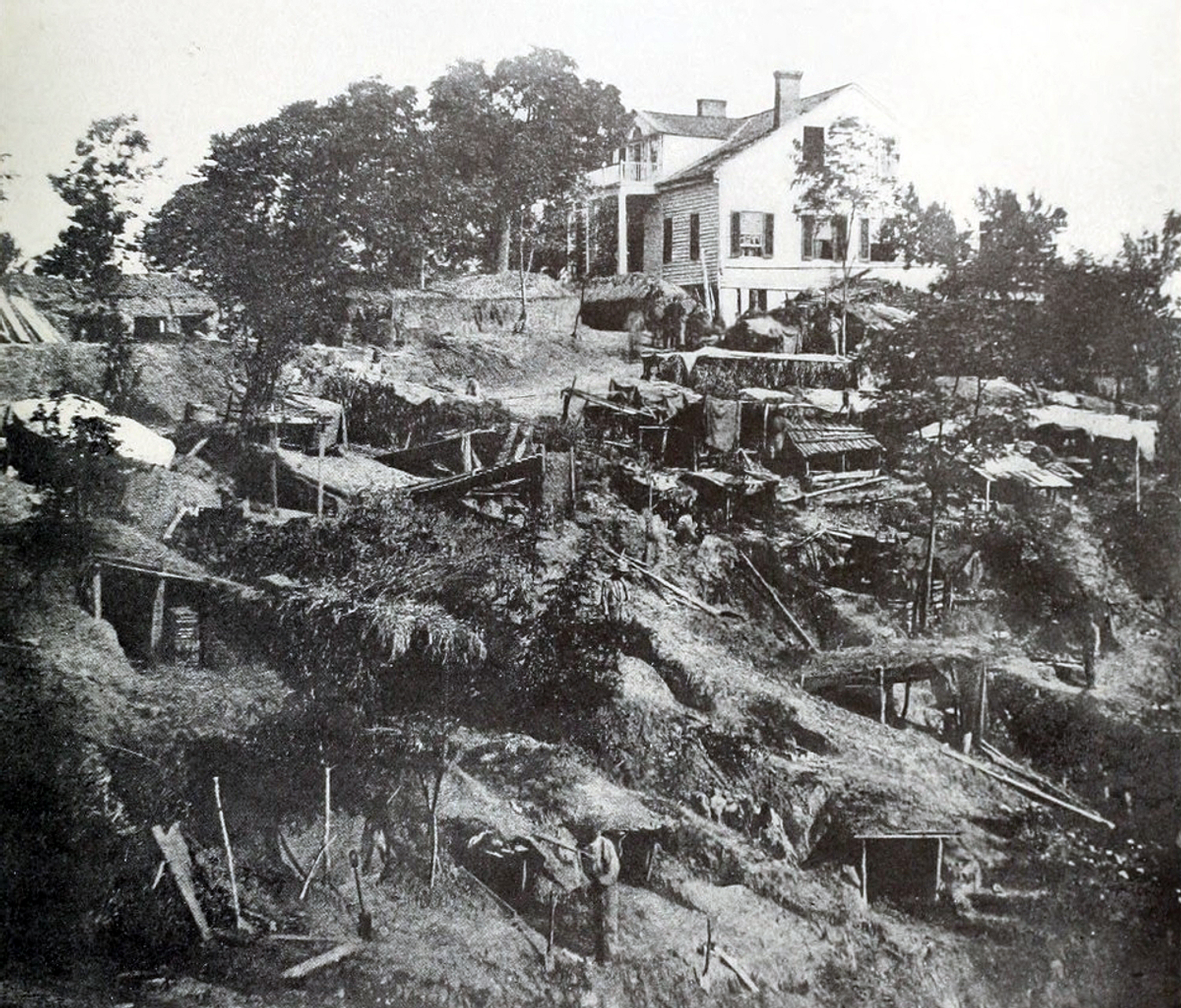
Shirley's White House Vicksburg in 1863

- Vicksburg, Mississippi: during the Siege of Vicksburg in 1863, Union gunboats lobbed over 22,000 shells into the town, destroying nearly all of the town's housing. As a result, over 500 caves were dug into the clay hills surrounding Vicksburg. The Union soldiers later gave the town the nickname of "Prairie Dog Village" due to these caves.
- Walt Disney World, Florida (southwest of Orlando, Florida) has a network of utility tunnels (the Disney utilidor system) used by its employees for transportation between venues, rest areas, staff preparation, and first aid. The main system is under the Magic Kingdom theme park. Other tunnels lie underneath Future World at Epcot.
- Washington D.C.: all of the buildings in the United States Capitol Complex are connected by tunnels and underground walkways, which provide easy passage between legislative office buildings, the Capitol, the Capitol Visitor Center, and the Library of Congress in inclement weather. The tunnels connecting office buildings are open to the public, but those connecting to the Capitol require security clearance to use. Small electric tramways run from the Capitol building to the Russell, Dirksen, and Hart Senate Office Buildings and to the Rayburn House Office Building. The tunnel between the Capitol and the Cannon House Office Building displays winning pieces of artwork from the annual Congressional Art Competition for high school students.
- Wellesley, Massachusetts: there is an underground network connecting several buildings at Wellesley College.

=== Mexico ===
- Guanajuato city was built over old silver mines, some of which are used as roads.
- Mexico City's metro system has many underground pedestrian walkways connecting stations.

== South America ==
=== Argentina ===
Buenos Aires, capital of Argentina, has an extensive number of underground cities in its Subte. Most stations have small shops, bars and kiosks, while main hubs interconnect through underground pedestrian walkways with railroad stations, governmental buildings, or shopping centres. Some have additional mall-like mezzanine levels, with the Centro Obelisk of Buenos Aires area (three lines, four underground levels), Estación Retiro, Estación Constitución, Estación Once, and Federico Lacroze railway station being the most important ones.

=== Chile ===
Santiago has some elements of an underground city in its "Metro" subway system. While all stations have a small mezzanine level above the tracks for ticket purchase, some key stations have extensive areas of shops and kiosks in addition. Some stations even have an additional mall-like level between the street and the mezzanine levels.

== See also ==
Other parent categories from the same field:

- Rock-cut architecture
- Subterranea (geography): underground structures
- Underground living
- Underground construction
- Édouard Utudjian

Types of underground spaces and people, and related topics:

- Ant tribe – Chinese sociology term
- Rat tribe
- Arcology – ecological architecture term
- Catacombs
- Cities of the Underworld documentary television series
- Mole people – homeless tunnel dwellers
- Pedway – elevated or underground walkways
- Rapid transit (subway)
- Secret passage
  - Tunnels in popular culture
- Skyway
- Utility tunnel
