= Baños del Ángel =

Islamic baths in Toledo, Spain

Coordinates: 39.8572°N 4.0300°W

The Baños del Ángel or Baños de Zeid are an Islamic baths located in the city of Toledo, in Castile-La Mancha, Spain. These are undoubtedly one of the best preserved among the eight that still maintain recognizable structures within the Historic Quarter of Toledo.

The restored room corresponds to the warm and, unlike other bathrooms, maintains the hypocaust until today better preserved of the Muslim civil architecture in Toledo. The enhancement of this bath allows, without doubt, allow to expand the knowledge about this type of constructions of Muslim origin that are essential to understand the urban structure, social organization and habits of life in Toledo between the 10th and 13th centuries.

== See also ==
- Wells of Toledo
