= Asematunneli =

Underground city and shopping center in Helsinki, Finland

Coordinates: 60°10′13″N 024°56′29″E

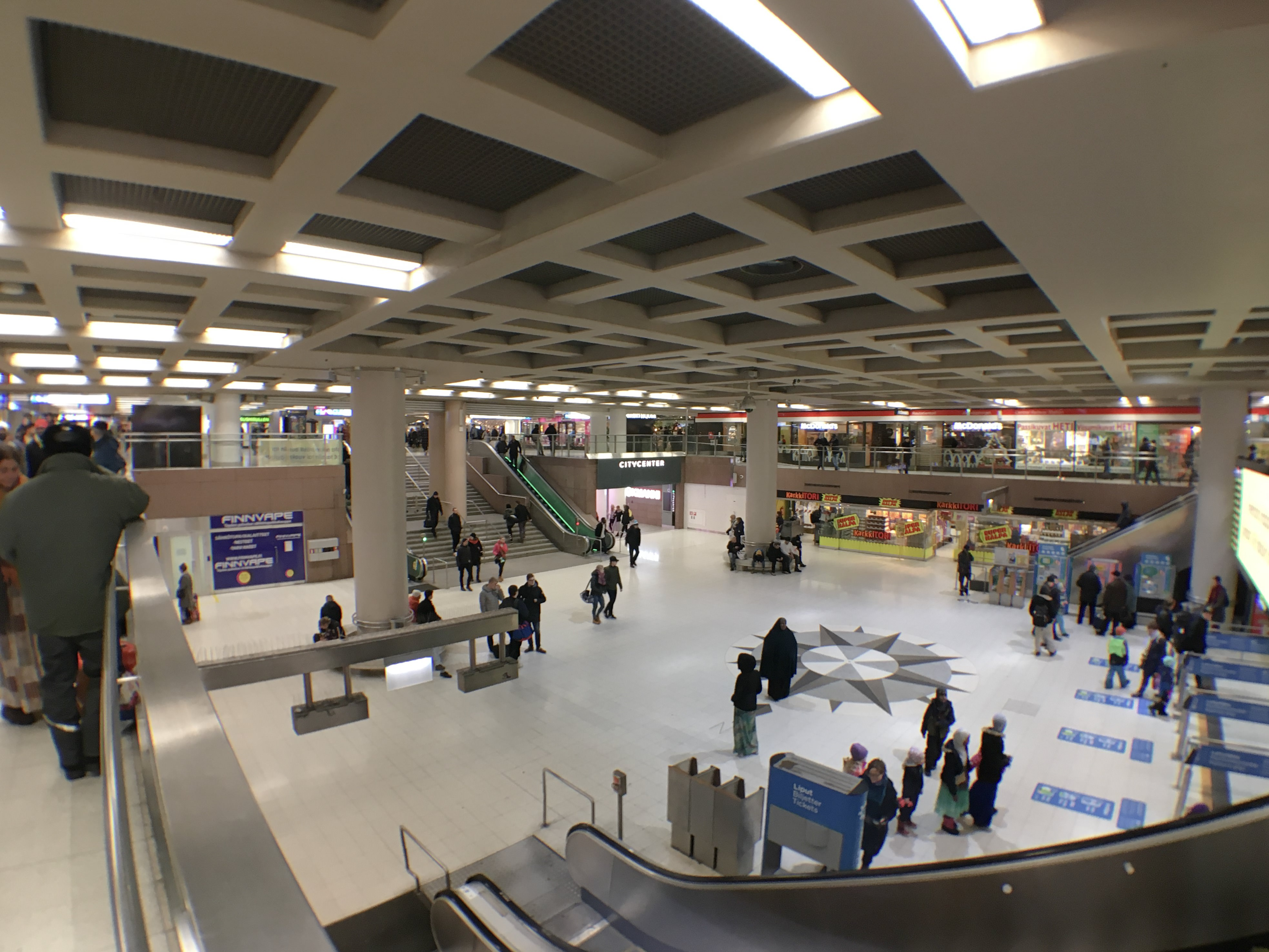
A view of the ticket sales area for the metro station.

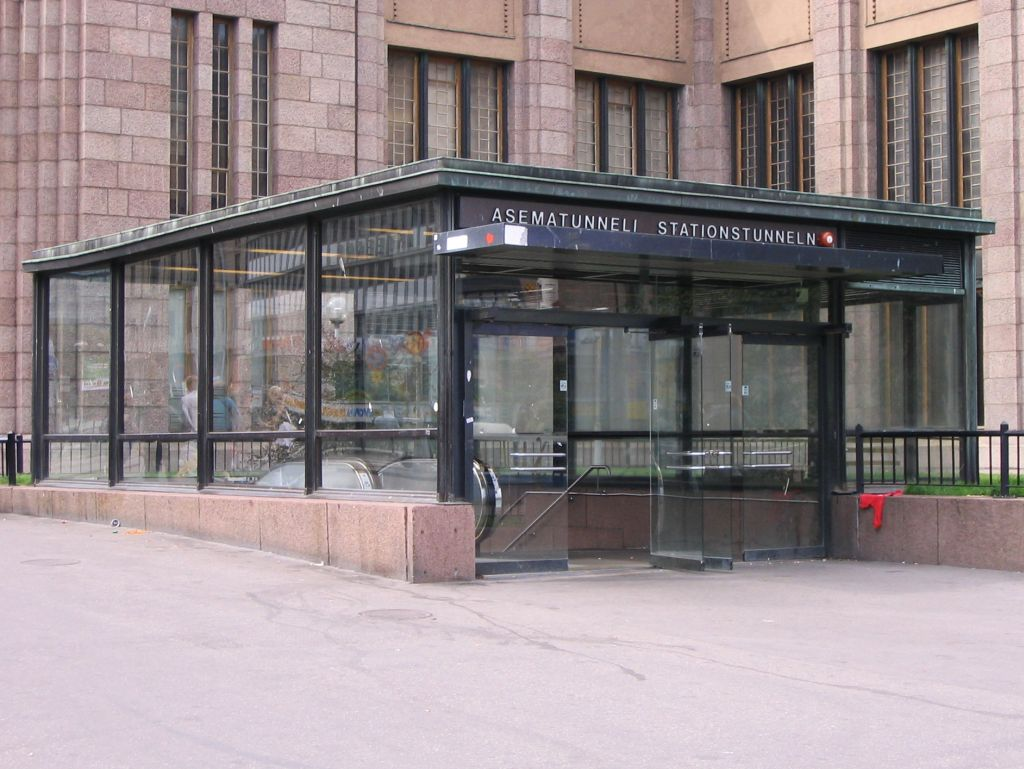
The entrance from Rautatientori.

Asematunneli (Swedish: Stationstunneln) is an underground city and shopping centre connecting the Helsinki Central railway station and City-Center in downtown Helsinki, Finland. The area also has a ticket sales area for the Rautatientori metro station and connections to the nearby Forum shopping centre as well as Stockmann and Sokos department stores. The shops and supermarkets in Asematunneli are licensed to stay open longer than normal as well as during the national holidays, making it an important location for last minute and emergency shopping for the people of the Greater Helsinki area. Kamppi Center and the bottom floor of Sähkötalo across Fredrikinkatu can also be accessed via tunnels by going through the Forum shopping centre first. The interconnecting areas provide for convenient movement across a wide area of central Helsinki, and allow pedestrians to escape the rain, snow, and cold weather that dominate much of the Finnish calendar.

Asematunneli was built by digging up Kaivokatu and pouring concrete canopies for the tunnels in 1966–1967.

The complex became the location of Finland's first Bitcoin vending machine in December 2013.

== Gallery ==
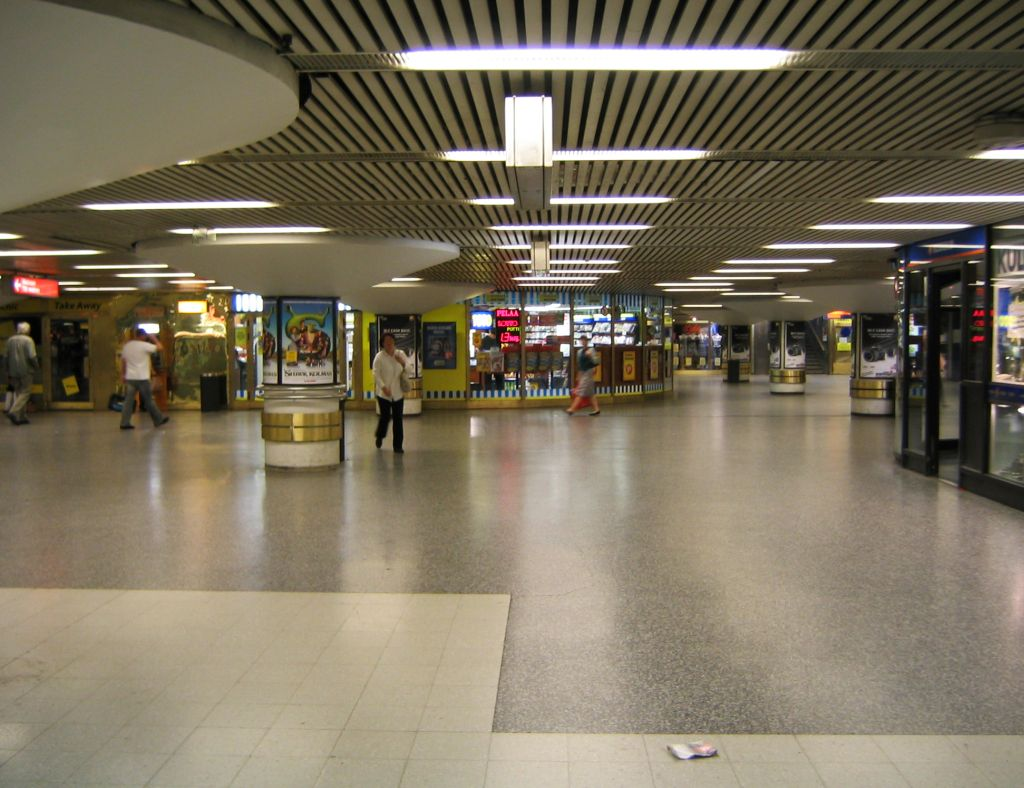
The view eastwards from the metro station.

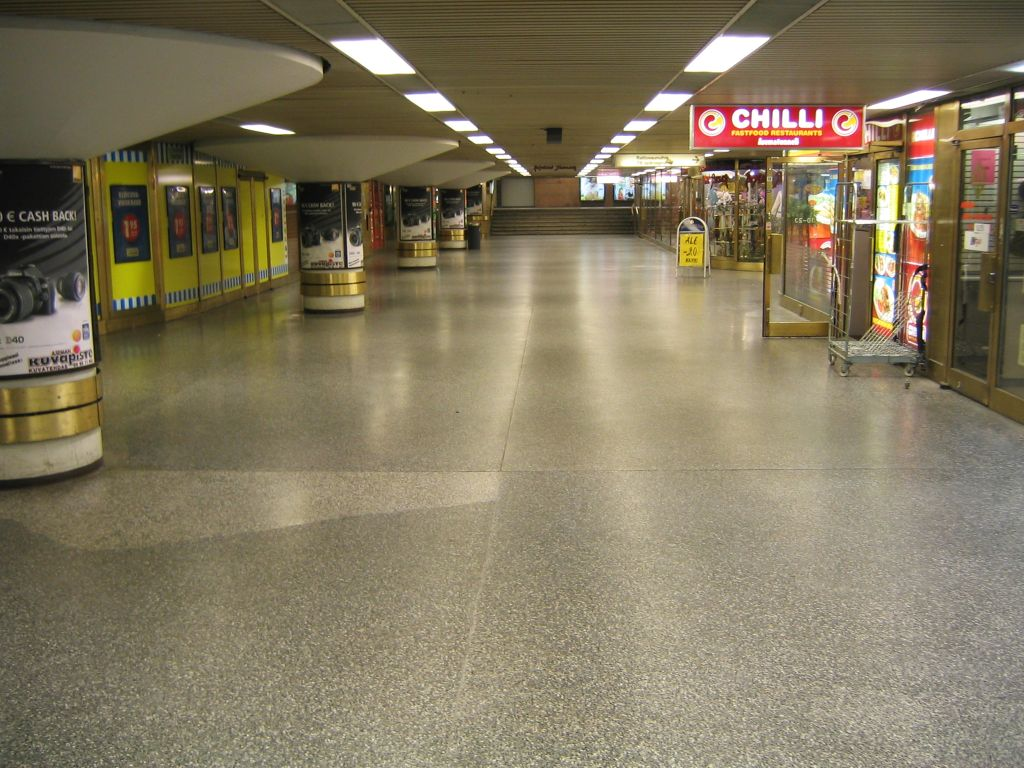
The eastern connecting point, from which the tram stops can be accessed.

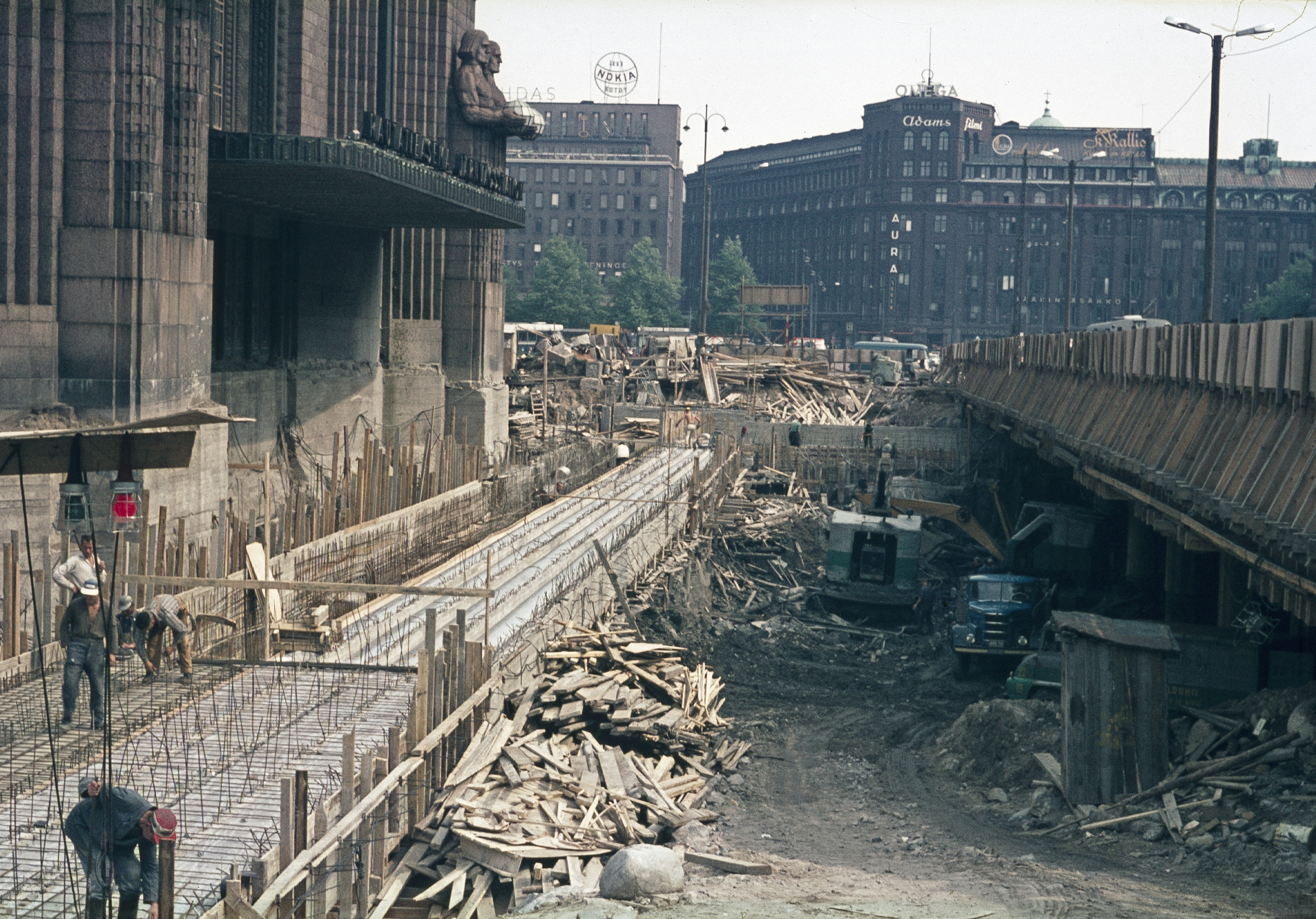
Construction of Asematunneli in front of Helsinki Central railway station in 1967.
