= Mazı Underground City =

Ancient underground settlement in Cappadocia, Turkey

Mazı Underground City is an ancient underground settlement in Cappadocia in central Turkey. It is located 18 kilometers from Ürgüp and 10 kilometers east from the Kaymaklı Underground City. The city is one of many subterranean cities in Cappadocia including Özkonak, Derinkuyu and Kaymaklı.

== History ==
The ancient name of the city was known as Mataza. The presence of the city dates back to as early as the Roman period. The city contains tombs dating back to the early Roman period and also contains aspects of the Byzantium period.

== Description ==
Mazi is carved to the west of the village perpendicular to the valley slope. It contained four different access points for entrance and exit to the city which all lead to a central hall. The main entrance to the city is made of millstone in which a stone could be rolled over and used to cover the entrance. The architecture includes steep tunnels networking between corridors. Within the city, areas were provided to serve as barns, with each area designated for different specialties. The space inside the city also contained a winery between the areas served as barns. In order for the winery to obtain grapes, there was a chimney which led to the surface and allowed grapes to fall down into. Additionally, the city contains a church which can be accessed via a short corridor.

== See also ==
- Derinkuyu Underground City
