= Hong Kong drifter =

Term in Hong Kong for young, educated migrants from mainland China

Hong Kong drifters (Chinese: 港漂; pinyin: gǎng piāo; Jyutping: gong2 piu1) are young, educated people who left mainland China to move to Hong Kong in search of a job and a place to live. They may experience difficulty assimilating into the culture of Hong Kong, which can vary from that of mainland China. The term Hong Kong drifter was first used in China by people in Internet chat rooms. The state may be a temporary one, depending upon a person's ability to adjust to the cultural and language differences.

== Background ==
With the aim of attracting talented people from mainland China and the rest of the world to settle and work in Hong Kong, the Quality Migrant Admission Scheme (QMAS) set up admissions criteria under which applicants could be admitted to residence in Hong Kong without the prior offer of local employment required for a normal working visa.

Universities in Hong Kong began to enroll students from mainland secondary schools since 1998, aiming to absorb talent from the mainland. However, it had not aroused much attention from the society until the Hong Kong University of Science and Technology recruited three top scorers of the College Entrance Examination in 2005. Since then, a “battle” between the Universities in Hong Kong and the top universities in mainland including Peking University and Tsinghua University has become increasingly fierce. In order to win over the mainland students, Hong Kong universities provide substantial scholarships which could reach $640,000 HK each student.

On the other hand, there are a variety of reasons that mainland students and their parents choose HK universities. One of the most crucial reasons is that Hong Kong is a cosmopolitan city which provides students with international stage and views. Moreover, the tuition fees of universities in Hong Kong is more acceptable compared to that of universities in the United States, United Kingdom, Australia, Canada and other western countries. Additionally the high scholarships are appealing to the mainland students. Another essential reason that cannot be ignored is that with considerable numbers of preeminent teachers from all around the world, the quality of education is remarkable and the teaching principle is more close to the western countries. In addition, the English teaching environment and the plenty of exchange programs prepare those students who want to take a postgraduate diploma abroad with beneficial experiences, which enable them to adjust to their study more smoothly.

== Immigrant incentive programs ==
=== University students ===
Not only the economic prosperity that attracts the mainlanders to move southern, the international higher education system in Hong Kong also attracts them. Universities in Hong Kong act as a major bridge between Hong Kong and the mainland. In 1998, the Hong Kong Jockey Club funded dozens of graduating mainland students study in Hong Kong. In 2003, the Chinese Ministry of Education first allowed Hong Kong universities to recruit mainland students. In 2012, of the 10,770 non-local students at the city's eight government-funded universities, more than 80% of them were from the mainland.

Scholarship is one of the ways to attract talented students from China to study in Hong Kong. Universities in Hong Kong offer considerable scholarships and rewards to the outstanding students from the mainland, the funding goes up to $9 million per year. Elites who are qualified to receive the academic scholarships from the school can take up to $0.64 million in four years. This has become one of the major reasons why mainland students, especially the middle class, would like to study here in Hong Kong.

In 2001, 4 years after the handover of Hong Kong, the Hong Kong SAR Government allows mainland fresh graduates to stay and work in the HKSAR. Therefore, studying in Hong Kong is all the rage in recent 10 year. Recently, after the result of college entrance examinations has been released, there has been a keen competition of top scorer between Hong Kong and Mainland's University. This phenomenon is constantly covered by both China and Hong Kong media in the news report.

According to official statistics, there are only about 1000 mainland students studying in Hong Kong's University in 2001. However, until 2007, there are more than 6000 mainland students admitted to Hong Kong's university every year. Together with the postgraduate program, there will be more than 10,000 mainland students studying in Hong Kong's University. Until 2007, there are over 23,000 students in Hong Kong who came from mainland China. On the other hand, there are about 20,000 experts came from mainland China through different scheme such as Quality Migrant Admission Scheme. Up to now, there are approximately 40,000 mainland university's student and experts living in Hong Kong.

Those Post-80s youngsters who came to Hong Kong to study are the top scorers in mainland China. However, not all of them are able to find a job after they graduated. They are caught in a dilemma whether to go back to the mainland or stay.

=== Professional and skilled workers ===
==== Immigration Arrangements for Non-local Graduates ====
Since 2001, the Hong Kong government has made special provision in its immigration ordinance, granting one year extensions to mainland students after graduation, with the expressed purpose of attracting new talent to the cities. Once mainland students graduate from Hong Kong universities, they have a full year to find jobs in the SAR. Hong Kong has also simplified the application process for working visas for mainland graduates.

Under the Immigration Arrangements for Non-local Graduates, non-local graduates refer to people from outside the Hong Kong Special Administrative Region who have obtained a degree or higher qualification in a full-time and locally accredited programme in Hong Kong. Hong Kong universities make use of this scheme to attract mainland students to stay after graduation.

==== Admission Scheme for Mainland Talents and Professionals ====
In July 2003, the Hong Kong government implemented the Admission Scheme for Mainland Talents and Professionals. The scheme's assessment criteria are in line with those under the General Employment Policy (GEP). The objective of the scheme is to attract qualified mainland talents and professionals to work in Hong Kong in order to meet local manpower needs and enhance Hong Kong's competitiveness in the globalised market. As at the end of 2012, 57 126 mainland talents and professionals were admitted under the scheme.

==== Quality Migrant Admission Scheme ====
In February 2006, the Hong Kong government announced the Quality Migrant Admission Scheme. It aims to attract talented people from mainland China and the rest of the world to settle and work in Hong Kong, hence, Hong Kong's economic competitiveness in the global market can be enhanced. The scheme set up admissions criteria under which applicants could be admitted to residence in Hong Kong without the prior offer of local employment required for a normal working visa. As at the end of 2012, a total of 2 392 applicants were allocated quotas.

== Challenges ==
=== Prejudices ===
One of the many concerns raised about Hong Kong drifter is being seen as an unrefined, unsophisticated person in the cosmopolitan city. They may be seen to have inferior clothes or style, lack of knowledge about technology, had a poor upbringing and unsophisticated manners. They may also be assumed to be members of the Chinese Communist Party.

Regarding the demographics of university students, Zhang Bingjie, a journalist student at Shue Yan University in Hong Kong said:

Most mainland students who attend Hong Kong universities are from major cities and well-to-do families. These stereotypes might apply to migrant workers that you see in Chengdu, or tourists in Hong Kong, but not to us. We are not your average mainlander. China is a big country, you can't make sweeping generalisations like that... (Offended by the stereotype against poorer people,) I know my family members have flaws but I still wouldn't want others to point fingers at them, you know what I mean?

=== Language ===
Hong Kong drifters who come to Hong Kong for higher education and speak broken Cantonese or do not speak Cantonese often feel isolated when they cannot communicate well with Hong Kong students and society. This can result in a small social circle with non-local classmates and makes it difficult to integrate into Hong Kong's mainstream. Due to cultural and institutional differences, social friction has been increasing over the past few years.

The news article The Inbetweeners describes the language challenge:

Many think twice about using broken Cantonese when ordering food at restaurants, but also hesitate to use Putonghua, to avoid being seen as yet another uncultured tourist. English is often a safe compromise.

— Dickson Lee and Edward Wong

=== Job and resource opportunities ===
It is difficult to find jobs in Hong Kong for a number of graduates from mainland either because it troubles the employer to get work visa for them or because they can't speak Cantonese well. They would rather employ Hong Kong people.

Recently, netizens have been advertising in newspapers about opposing "Hong Kong drifters" from occupying resources of universities in Hong Kong. It also accused the graduated mainland students are stealing job opportunities from locals, harming their interest. Some locals even request for a reduction in mainland students’ admission so as to protect local's further studies and employment.

However, some see the Hong Kong drifters as high quality labour force which bring positive competitiveness and maintain the development of Hong Kong economy.

=== "Overcharging" mainland students ===
Mainland Chinese university students in Hong Kong are charged the same tuition fees as other non-local students. This has led to resentment among some mainland Chinese, who believe they are being "overcharged". In 2006, the Chinese education official Cao Guoxing advocated lowering tuition fees for mainland students in Hong Kong on the grounds that it would reduce barriers between Chinese and Hong Kong students.

Some mainland Chinese netizens established a Facebook page titled "Against overcharging Mainland Hong Kong university students" to pressure Hong Kong universities to stop "overcharging" mainland students. In response to these sentiments, a spokesman for the University of Hong Kong said that fees for mainland students were still "heavily subsidised" in relation to the actual cost of providing tertiary education.

The high number of mainland students in Hong Kong universities has also spurred discontent among some local Hong Kong students. For example, a Facebook page was launched called "Anti-mainlandisation of Hong Kong University" (反對本港大學濫收大陸學生) was launched due to the increasing proportion of mainland students being admitted to local universities.

== See also ==
- Ant tribe
