= Baños del Caballel =

The Baños del Caballel or Baños del Cabalillo are an Islamic public baths located in Toledo, in Castile-La Mancha, Spain. The first references to the Baños del Caballel date back to 1183. The preserved architectural remains are under the buildings of the Plaza del Infantes, 13 and 14 and the numbers 5 and 6 of the Plaza de las Fuentes. The plant is not well-defined by access problems and destruction caused by building houses, but it seems to be organized in a transverse nave of access to which three are offset longitudinally, corresponding to the cold, warm and hot rooms.

The proximity of the square and the mosque, the abundance of water in the area and the rootedness of the baths among the Muslims make the environment of the plaza de las Fuentes a place full of lavatories and bathrooms.

Less than a hundred meters from the Islamic Baths of Caballel are the Islamic Baños del Cenizal.
