= Ant tribe =

Neologism

- Traditional Chinese: 蟻族
- Simplified Chinese: 蚁族
Transcriptions
Standard Mandarin
- Hanyu Pinyin: yǐzú
- Bopomofo: ㄧˇㄗㄨˊ

"Ant tribe" is a neologism for a group of low-income university graduates who settle for a poverty-level existence in the cities of China. Those who belong to the ant tribe class hope that, in time, they will find the jobs for which they were trained in college. Lian Si (Chinese: 廉思), then a postdoctoral researcher at Peking University, coined the term "ant tribe" to draw a comparison between the lives of these college graduates and ants: "They share every similarity with ants. They live in colonies in cramped areas. They're intelligent and hardworking, yet anonymous and underpaid." Typically consisting of those born during and after the 1980s, the ant tribe is considered the fourth disadvantaged social class in the Chinese social paradigm, alongside the traditionally disadvantaged classes of the peasantry, the migrant workers, and those formerly employed by government-owned corporations and left unemployed by the reform and opening up in China.

== A Chinese paradigm ==
=== Background ===
After reading "The Down Youth" (Chinese: 向下的青春), an article in China Newsweek (Note: China Newsweek is not affiliated from the United States Newsweek publication. It was founded as is managed by China News Service.) about the difficult living conditions of college graduates born in the 1980s, the PKU social scientist Lian Si began to research the living conditions of college graduates. Lian found that there was a similarity between the hard-working, smart and "stuck on the ground" ants and the struggling crowds of city-dwelling college graduates. This led Lian to coin the viral phrase "ant tribe". The college graduates, with degrees in economics, engineering, management and medicine, and based upon a seven-city survey are earning on average US$286 (CNY 1,904) a month as reported in 2010. The 2010 Annual Report on the Development of Chinese Talent, which reports the results of another survey, estimates that there are 1 million people who fit the definition of ant tribe members living in slum conditions.

A key characteristic of the ant tribe is their optimism. After college education, young people often stay in urban areas to maximize their career prospects. As a result, they accept the short-term consequences of starting-level positions for which they are over-qualified, believing that they will rise to their desired job level in time. There's a correlation between the prestige of degree and the size of the city that they hope to live. Students from the best colleges generally flock to big cities, while students with vocational training are more likely to vie for positions in smaller cities.

To control costs, ant tribe people are likely to rent small rooms or share a crowded small apartment in the city slums. Accommodation is often spartan: little furniture and no air conditioning, even as the temperatures in the major cities of China frequently exceed 100 °F (38 °C). Some ant tribe dwellings have no window and many utilize a shared bath, unless their owners are able and willing to shoulder the costs for a private bath. Some have no access to hot water or heating. These apartments, while located in the major cities of China and host college-educated people, are noted to resemble slums in third-world countries.

=== Factors ===
Some of the factors that made the plights of the ant tribe possible and difficult to surmount in China are:

==== General economic and market factors ====
Rising housing costs, as much as 33% increase over recent years and a 9.5% increase from 2009 to 2010, have made it very difficult to find affordable housing. Successful programs to recruit college students has resulted in a large number of individuals seeking professional positions. In 1998 the program to build the number of professionals saw the successful number of graduates reach 830,000. The number rose to 6 million by May, 2009. However, there were no reciprocal programs to ensure that professional positions would be available for these new graduates.

==== Education reform ====
In 1996, China began expanding university enrollment to meet growing demands of educated laborers, which contributed to the deflation of the undergraduate degree. Excessive enrollment and ignorance of professional training skills massively inflated the raw number of college graduates, while the market demanded more technical laborers. As a result, the skill set of Chinese college graduates became undesirable to the growing market.

==== Wages ====
Wages in many positions have been cut between 50 and 100% in large cities because of the large number of people entering the job markets there, making wages lower than factory workers. Regarding alternative temporary jobs, these young adults may accept jobs where their wage is subject to aggressive sales quotas that, if unmet, lowers their actual wage. Wages for professional positions has not seen a substantial change up or down. Consequently, even if the ant tribe people eventually attain their desired job level, these jobs would be worth even less due to increases in the cost of living. Due to the structure of China's economy, the demand for uneducated manual laborers to work in manufacturing has soared, resulting in up to an 80% increase in pay over the six-year period between 2003 and 2009.

==== Socio-economic factors ====
Most of the ant tribe come from rural or less developed districts, and many are raised in uneducated agricultural families. Graduates who come from a rural background may not have the social skills and connections ("guanxi") important in building a successful career. People who have migrated into the city are not eligible for government supported programs, such as social welfare benefits and subsidized housing. Traditionally, those who have migrated from rural towns to the cities consider it shameful to seek work in their hometown. Often, their parents have endured significant hardship to support the student through college and placed hopes of attaining a higher living standard in the cities upon those college graduates. To many in the ant tribe, it is preferable to stay in the city regardless of the living and working conditions, even if many of them cannot even afford to travel home during Chinese New Year, traditionally a time for family reunion. As of 2012, the 80s generation are approaching the age when they are socially pressured to marry and to have children, which requires even better living conditions.

If more opportunities do not become available for the 1980s generation, their dissatisfaction presents a significant socio-economic challenge for the Chinese government.

=== Transition ===
As the result of publicity of Lian's book on the ant tribe, representatives from the National People's Congress (NPC) visited Tangjialing, a district of Beijing reportedly with the largest population of ant tribe people, to review the situation. Following their review, a plan was developed by the local government to improve the ant tribe's living conditions. About 50,000 young people were displaced to nearby villages as Tangjialing prepared to begin demolition and reconstruction of the area.

In the meantime, many of the people that Lian originally studied are still living a marginal existence. To them, living in a large city means living a poor life due to the higher cost of living. There may be a general trend for young people to move to smaller and mid-sized cities as Chinese companies relocate to those areas from the larger cities to control their costs. Another strategy these young adults employ is to modify their career goals by seeking highly demanded positions in the medical industry, such as nursing; or education. Instead of flocking to big cities in search of the American Dream, social scientists encourage them to try their luck in smaller cities. Rather than being blinded by the glamor of success in a big city, "they should gain more insight into their own strengths and weakness, in order for them to make the right decisions."

=== Proposed solutions ===
- To relieve the pressure felt by the ant tribe and caused by the rapidly increasing real estate prices, the Chinese government has taken some actions, such as lowering taxes, constructing cheaper rental apartments, and legislating a higher minimum wage.
- Another proposed solution is for universities to limit their enrollments and to establish undergraduate curricula that more specifically aimed at fields with attainable jobs.

=== Related information ===
- Song composed by Li Liguo and Bai Wanlong which expresses the feeling of the ant tribe.
- The Struggle of Ant Tribe (Chinese: 蚁族的奋斗, or 我要怒放的生命)

== Comparison to other countries and regions ==
- Generally, the rate of unemployment is much lower for individuals with college or university degrees. As of 2008, there were only four countries where the largest share of the unemployed were made up of people with college or university degrees: Taiwan, Belarus, Peru and the United States.
- In Asia, based on an International Labour Organization (ILO) report from 2010, there is a lower job participation rate of young adults, which may make them another "Lost generation". This is partially due to college graduates leaving their homelands to find jobs in other countries, resulting in a brain drain.
- In Palestine there are about 45,000 people entering the job market each year. The Palestinian Employment and Social Protection Fund is working to expand employment opportunities, including those for college graduates.
- In Egypt, 90% of the unemployed are younger than 30 years of age. This is partly due to different expectations between employers and college graduates of the skills required for gainful employment and a lack of support for graduating young adults for a successful school-to-work transition. An ILO project is being initiated to modernize Egypt's employment office services to better support the transition of young adults into the workforce.
- In Hong Kong, a Youth Preemployment Training Programme was developed to help ease graduates into the workforce. About 2000, 50% of graduates interested in attaining employment found good jobs. Further monies were provided to the program at the turn of the decade to continue the program.
- In Indonesia, where the rate of college graduates in the labor force has been increasing over the past 30 years, the rate of employment is higher for those with college degrees than those who have not graduated from college, therefore governmental programs to address unemployment among young adults focuses on training programs to develop marketable skills. The government also encourages university graduates to establish their own businesses.

== See also ==
- Rat tribe
- Hong Kong drifter
- Underemployment
- Moonlight clan, Chinese: 月光族, a Chinese term referring to people who live paycheck-to-paycheck
- Not currently engaged in Employment, Education or Training (NEET, Chinese: 啃老族)
- American dream
