= Rat tribe =

Low-income migrant workers in China

Rat tribe (Chinese: 鼠族; pinyin: shǔzú) is a neologism used to describe low income migrant workers and Chinese who live in underground accommodations within Chinese cities.They also live in very poor conditions with windowless and very poor ventilation without lots of sunlight. As of 2015, official estimates are of 281,000 people living in Beijing's underground, although estimates of up to one million have also been widely reported.

== Background ==
Housing policy dating back to the early stages of the Cold War instigated the incorporation of basement air raid shelters into newly built residential buildings. Encouraged by Deng Xiaoping's reform and opening up, migrant workers and Chinese began emigrating from rural areas to more urban ones, lured by the benefits of higher salaries and standards of living. To accommodate the population surge, the Chinese government permitted the use of these shelters as residences. Without a valid residential permit many migrants and Chinesewere unable to afford the cost of purchasing their own home on arrival and instead turned towards these low cost rooms.

In late 2010, the term "鼠族" began being used to describe underground dwellers in the Chinese press. Shortly after, the Ministry of Housing and Urban-Rural Development formally banned residential rentals of basements and air raid shelters due to safety concerns. By early 2015, state media had reported that 120,000 people had been evicted from underground residences.

== Accommodation ==
While still illegal, many migrant workers and Chinese choose to live in these centrally located conditions to avoid a longer commute to their workplace. According to a 2013 study, the median area for an underground room in Beijing was 9.75 square metres (104.9 ft^{2}) and the average price was 436 yuan per month. Hygiene conditions in these residences are generally poor, with shared communal facilities. In one instance, people across 80 rooms had access to a single toilet.

== See also ==
- Ant tribe
- Mole people
- Underground city
