= Baños del Cenizal =

The Baños del Cenizal are an Islamic baths located in the city of Toledo, in Castile-La Mancha, Spain. They are declared of Bien de Interés Cultural.
