= Wells of Toledo =

Water sources in Toledo, Spain

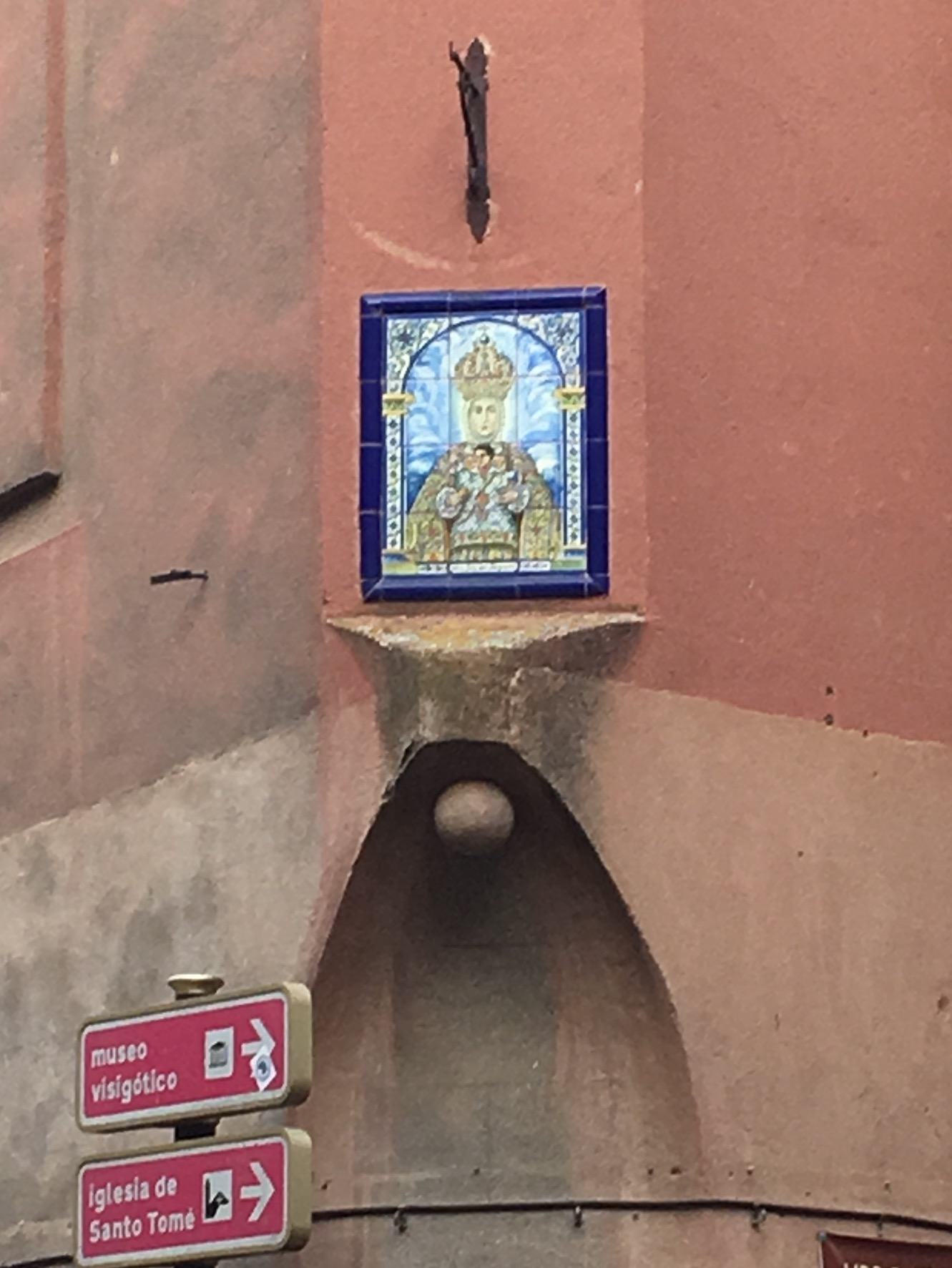
A Well/Reservoir Indicator

Before the standardization of modern plumbing, two common ways existed to access water in Toledo, Spain. These include the Tagus river that runs alongside the city, water wells and water reservoirs. Water wells and reservoirs were generally placed inside the city centre, or in some cases, within individual housing. They were generally denoted by a water well or reservoir indicator (pictured). Generally the indicators consisted of small stone balls (Spanish: Bolas). In case of a fire, the public would know who had a water well or reservoir. Many streets that had these wells/reservoirs were entitled as such, with many sharing the name "Well Street" (Spanish: Calle Pozo).

== Legends ==
=== The Bitter Well ===
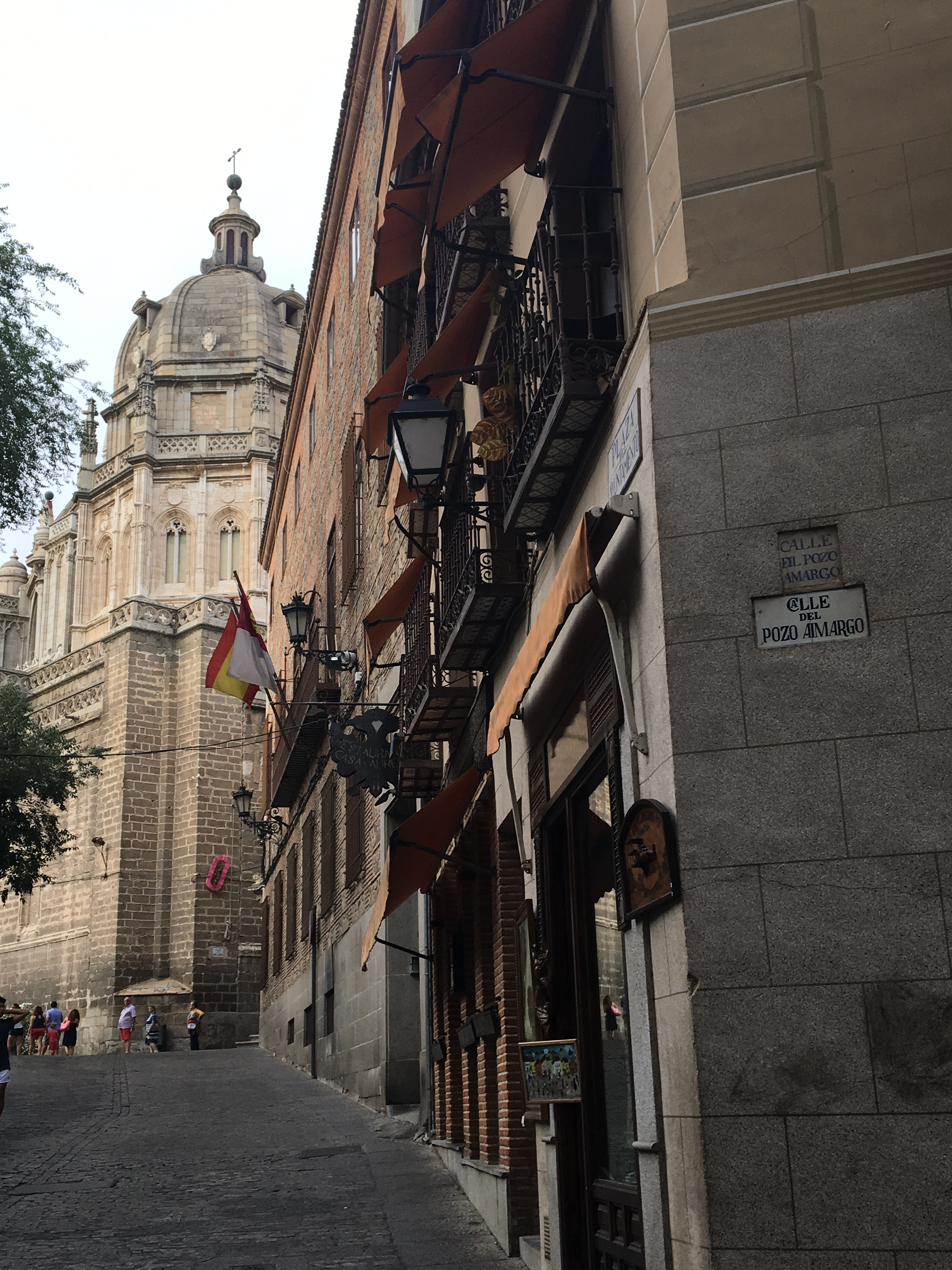
The Plaza of the Pozo Amargo

The Well is a Spanish urban legend concerning the Wells of Toledo and two lovers. Fernando, a Christian man and Raquel, a Jewish woman were, according to the story "head-over-heels in love" with each other. Each night, when the church bells rang, Fernando would scale the walls into Raquel's family garden and sit with Raquel on the edge of the well. However, once Raquel's father discovered the lovers, he sent an assassin to murder Fernando. After the murder of Fernando, Raquel sat at the well every night, crying over her lost lover. The legend goes that one night, she saw Fernando's face at the bottom of the well and jumped in to be with him. There is now a plaque established beside the well believed to be the one described in the urban legend. The plaque reads "The tears of the memory, longing for the beloved caused in a young Toledan girl, makes the waters of this well bitter." (Spanish: "Las lágrimas que el recuerdo, añoranza del amado causaron en una joven toledana, amargaron las aguas de este pozo.")

=== The Water of the Virgen ===
A popular theory in Toledo is that many of the cathedrals and churches have some type of running water underground, many of which are said to be sacred or miraculous. A legend in particular tells the miracle of the water of Virgen that took place in the Toledo Cathedral. Since the seventeenth century, this cathedral has celebrated the day of Our Sacred Lady, patron of Toledo, on the fifteenth of August. One year, while all of the people were observing the holiday outside of the cathedral (on account of the heat inside) a young man overheated and fainted, and seemed to be dead. Some people brought water from the wells inside the cathedral in order to reanimate him, he was supposedly revived. The people said this was a miracle, done by the Virgen whom they were celebrating. Additionally, with the same wells, stories recall during the Reconquista, the image of the Virgen was kept safe from the invasion inside a church well.

== Well-known wells ==
=== The Well of Salvador ===
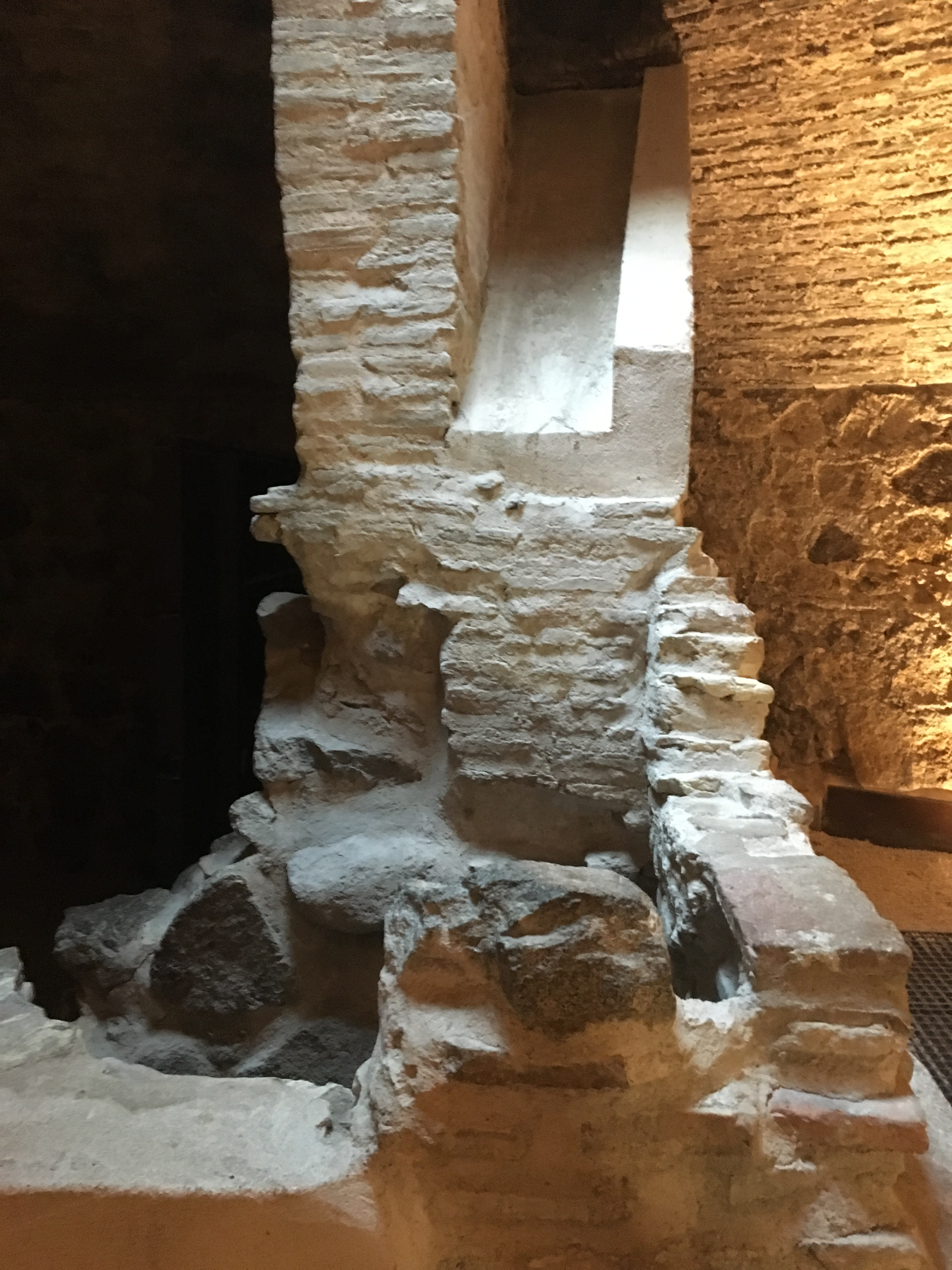
El Pozo de El Salvador

This well is currently positioned below a plaza, but originally it was placed below a convent of the El Salvador church. The Well of Salvador has a water reservoir that collects water from the rain. There is also a regular well that brings groundwater.

=== The water reservoir of Alcázar ===
The water reservoir of Alcázar provided water to the soldiers of Francoist during the Siege of the Alcázar of Toledo.

=== Wells of the Toledan Baths ===
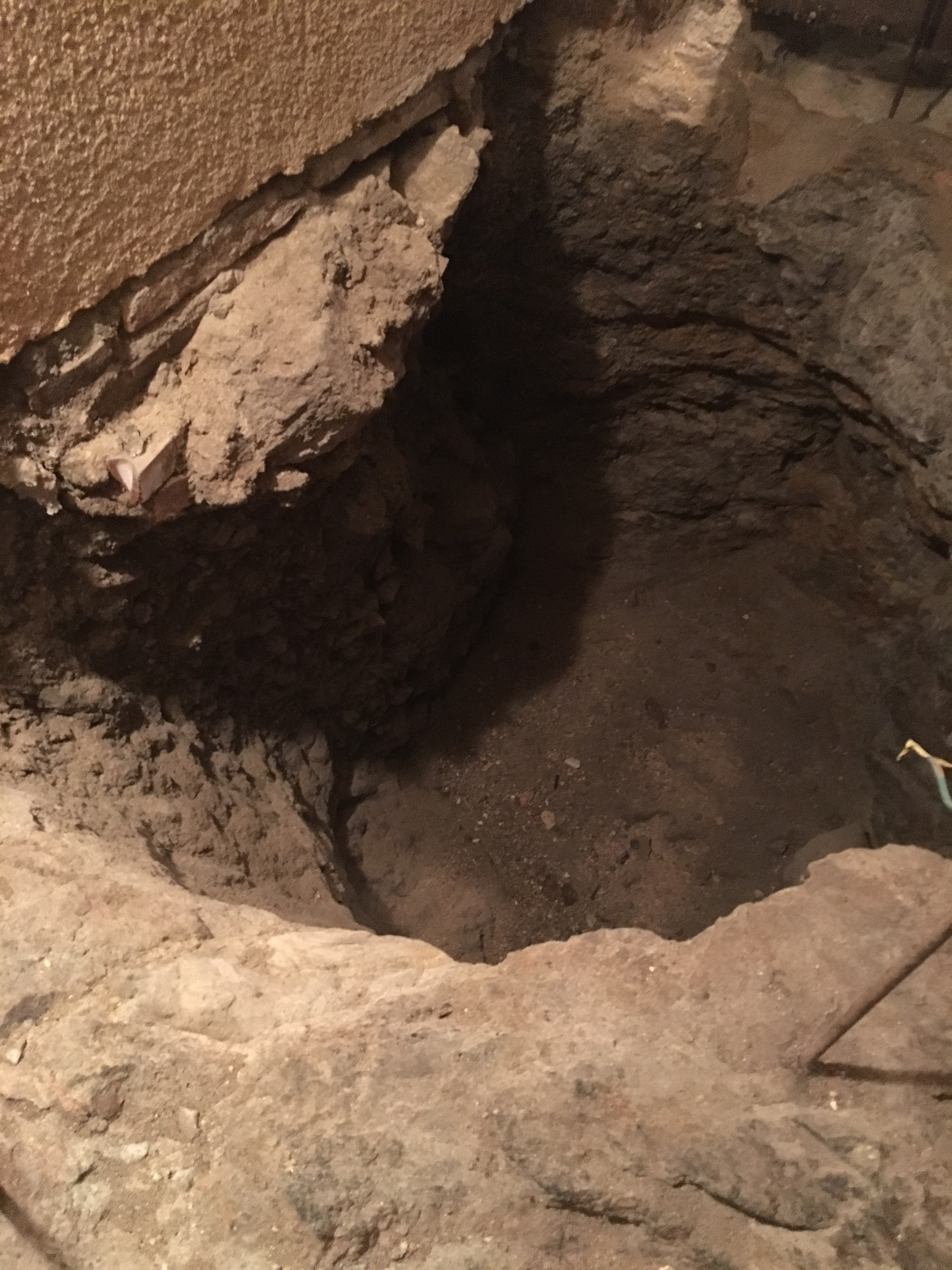
A dry well in one of the underground baths of Toledo

There are various Roman baths and Arabic baths within Toledo. All of these baths have a well, the majority of which are dry now, in order to provide water to the baths. A well of an Arabic bath that is named Caballel is pictured right. Normally there were three rooms to bathe in within the baths: one with hot water, one with lukewarm water, and finally one with cold water. There are also the ruins of the Roman baths that one can visit, and a bath under a house in la Judería.
