= List of populated places in Nevşehir Province =

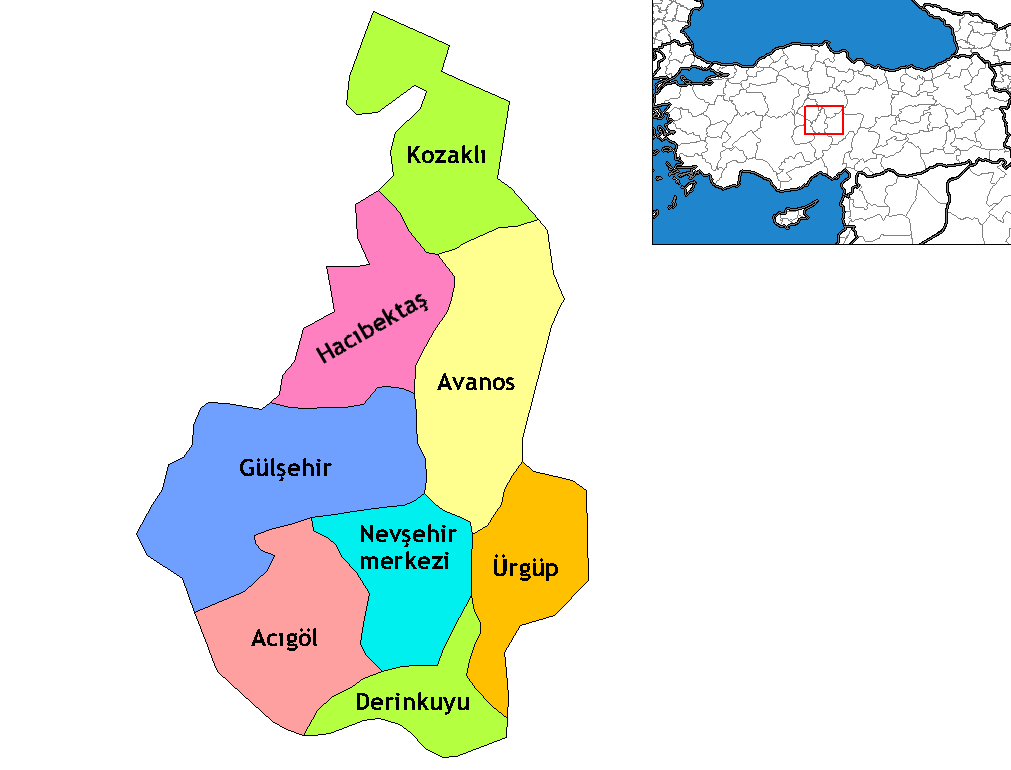
Nevşehir Province

Below is the list of populated places in Nevşehir Province, Turkey by the districts. In the following lists first place in each list is the administrative center of the district.

== Nevşehir ==
- Nevşehir
- Alacaşar, Nevşehir
- Balcın, Nevşehir
- Basansarnıç, Nevşehir
- Boğaz, Nevşehir
- Çardak, Nevşehir
- Çat, Nevşehir
- Çiftlikköy, Nevşehir
- Göre, Nevşehir
- Göreme, Nevşehir
- Güvercinlik, Nevşehir

== Acıgöl ==
- Acıgöl
- Ağıllı, Acıgöl
- Bağlıca, Acıgöl
- Çullar, Acıgöl
- İnallı, Acıgöl
- Karacaören, Acıgöl
- Karapınar, Acıgöl
- Kozluca, Acıgöl
- Kurugöl, Acıgöl
- Tatların, Acıgöl
- Tepeköy, Acıgöl
- Topaç, Acıgöl
- Yuva, Acıgöl

== Avanos ==
- Avanos
- Akarca, Avanos
- Aktepe, Avanos
- Altıpınar, Avanos
- Bozca, Avanos
- Büyükayhan, Avanos
- Çalış, Avanos
- Çavuşin, Avanos
- Göynük, Avanos
- İğdelikışla, Avanos
- Kalaba, Avanos
- Karacauşağı, Avanos
- Kuyulukışla, Avanos
- Küçükayhan, Avanos
- Mahmat, Avanos
- Özkonak, Avanos
- Paşalı, Avanos
- Topaklı, Avanos
- Üçkuyu, Avanos

== Derinkuyu ==
- Derinkuyu
- Çakıllı, Derinkuyu
- Doğala, Derinkuyu
- Güneyce, Derinkuyu
- Kuyulutatlar, Derinkuyu
- Özlüce, Derinkuyu
- Suvermez, Derinkuyu
- Til, Derinkuyu
- Yazıhüyük, Derinkuyu

== Gülşehir ==
- Gülşehir
- Abuuşağı, Gülşehir
- Alemli, Gülşehir
- Alkan, Gülşehir
- Bölükören, Gülşehir
- Civelek, Gülşehir
- Dadağı, Gülşehir
- Eğrikuyu, Gülşehir
- Emmiler, Gülşehir
- Eskiyaylacık, Gülşehir
- Fakıuşağı, Gülşehir
- Gökçetoprak, Gülşehir
- Gülpınar, Gülşehir
- Gümüşkent, Gülşehir
- Gümüşyazı, Gülşehir
- Hacıhalilli, Gülşehir
- Hacılar, Gülşehir
- Hamzalı, Gülşehir
- Karacaşar, Gülşehir
- Karahüyük, Gülşehir
- Kızılkaya, Gülşehir
- Oğulkaya, Gülşehir
- Ovaören, Gülşehir
- Şahinler, Gülşehir
- Terlemez, Gülşehir
- Tuzköyü, Gülşehir
- Yakatarla, Gülşehir
- Yalıntaş, Gülşehir
- Yamalı, Gülşehir
- Yeniyaylacık, Gülşehir
- Yeşilli, Gülşehir
- Yeşilöz, Gülşehir
- Yeşilyurt, Gülşehir
- Yüksekli, Gülşehir

== Hacıbektaş ==
- Hacıbektaş
- Akçataş, Hacıbektaş
- Anapınar, Hacıbektaş
- Aşağıbarak, Hacıbektaş
- Aşıklar, Hacıbektaş
- Avuç, Hacıbektaş
- Başköy, Hacıbektaş
- Belbarak, Hacıbektaş
- Büyükburunağıl, Hacıbektaş
- Büyükkışla, Hacıbektaş
- Çiğdem, Hacıbektaş
- Çivril, Hacıbektaş
- Hasanlar, Hacıbektaş
- Hıdırlar, Hacıbektaş
- Hırkatepesidelik, Hacıbektaş
- İlicek, Hacıbektaş
- Karaburç, Hacıbektaş
- Karaburna, Hacıbektaş
- Karaova, Hacıbektaş
- Kayaaltı, Hacıbektaş
- Kayı, Hacıbektaş
- Kızılağıl, Hacıbektaş
- Killik, Hacıbektaş
- Kisecik, Hacıbektaş
- Köşektaş, Hacıbektaş
- Kütükçü, Hacıbektaş
- Mikail, Hacıbektaş
- Sadık, Hacıbektaş
- Yenice, Hacıbektaş
- Yeniyapan, Hacıbektaş
- Yurtyeri, Hacıbektaş

== Kozaklı ==
- Kozaklı
- Abdi, Kozaklı
- Akpınar, Kozaklı
- Aylı, Kozaklı
- Belekli, Kozaklı
- Boğaziçi, Kozaklı
- Büyükyağlı, Kozaklı
- Cağşak, Kozaklı
- Çayiçi, Kozaklı
- Doyduk, Kozaklı
- Dörtyol, Kozaklı
- Gerce, Kozaklı
- Hacıfakılı, Kozaklı
- Hızıruşağı, Kozaklı
- İmran, Kozaklı
- Kalecik, Kozaklı
- Kanlıca, Kozaklı
- Kapaklı, Kozaklı
- Karahasanlı, Kozaklı
- Karasenir, Kozaklı
- Kaşkışla, Kozaklı
- Kuruağıl, Kozaklı
- Küçükyağlı, Kozaklı
- Küllüce, Kozaklı
- Merdanali, Kozaklı
- Özce, Kozaklı
- Taşlıhüyük, Kozaklı
- Yassıca, Kozaklı

== Ürgüp ==
- Ürgüp
- Akköy, Ürgüp
- Ayvalı, Ürgüp
- Bahçeli, Ürgüp
- Başdere, Ürgüp
- Boyalı, Ürgüp
- Cemil, Ürgüp
- Çökek, Ürgüp
- Demirtaş, Ürgüp
- İbrahimpaşa, Ürgüp
- İltaş, Ürgüp
- Karacaören, Ürgüp
- Karain, Ürgüp
- Karakaya, Ürgüp
- Karlık, Ürgüp
- Mazı, Ürgüp
- Mustafapaşa, Ürgüp
- Ortahisar, Ürgüp
- Sarıhıdır, Ürgüp
- Sofular, Ürgüp
- Şahinefendi, Ürgüp
- Taşkınpaşa, Ürgüp
- Ulaşlı, Ürgüp
- İcik, Nevşehir
- Kavak, Nevşehir
- Kaymaklı, Nevşehir
- Nar, Nevşehir
- Özyayla, Nevşehir
- Sulusaray, Nevşehir
- Uçhisar, Nevşehir
