= List of municipalities in Nevşehir Province =

This is the List of municipalities in Nevşehir Province, Turkey as of March 2023.

District	Municipality
Acıgöl	Acıgöl
Acıgöl	Karapınar
Acıgöl	Tatlarin
Avanos	Avanos
Avanos	Çalış
Avanos	Kalaba
Avanos	Özkonak
Derinkuyu	Derinkuyu
Derinkuyu	Yazıhüyük
Gülşehir	Gülşehir
Hacıbektaş	Hacıbektaş
Kozaklı	Kozaklı
Nevşehir	Çat
Nevşehir	Göre
Nevşehir	Göreme
Nevşehir	Kavak
Nevşehir	Kaymaklı
Nevşehir	Nar
Nevşehir	Nevşehir
Nevşehir	Sulusaray
Nevşehir	Uçhisar
Ürgüp	Ortahisar
Ürgüp	Ürgüp
