= Yakatarla =

Yakatarla is a name given to villages in Turkey.

Yakatarla may also refer to:

- Yakatarla, Gülşehir, Village in Nevşehir.
- Yakatarla, Ovacık, Village in Tunceli
