= Love Valley, Cappadocia =

Valley in Göreme Historical National Park, Cappadocia, Turkey

Love Valley
- Aşk Vadisi
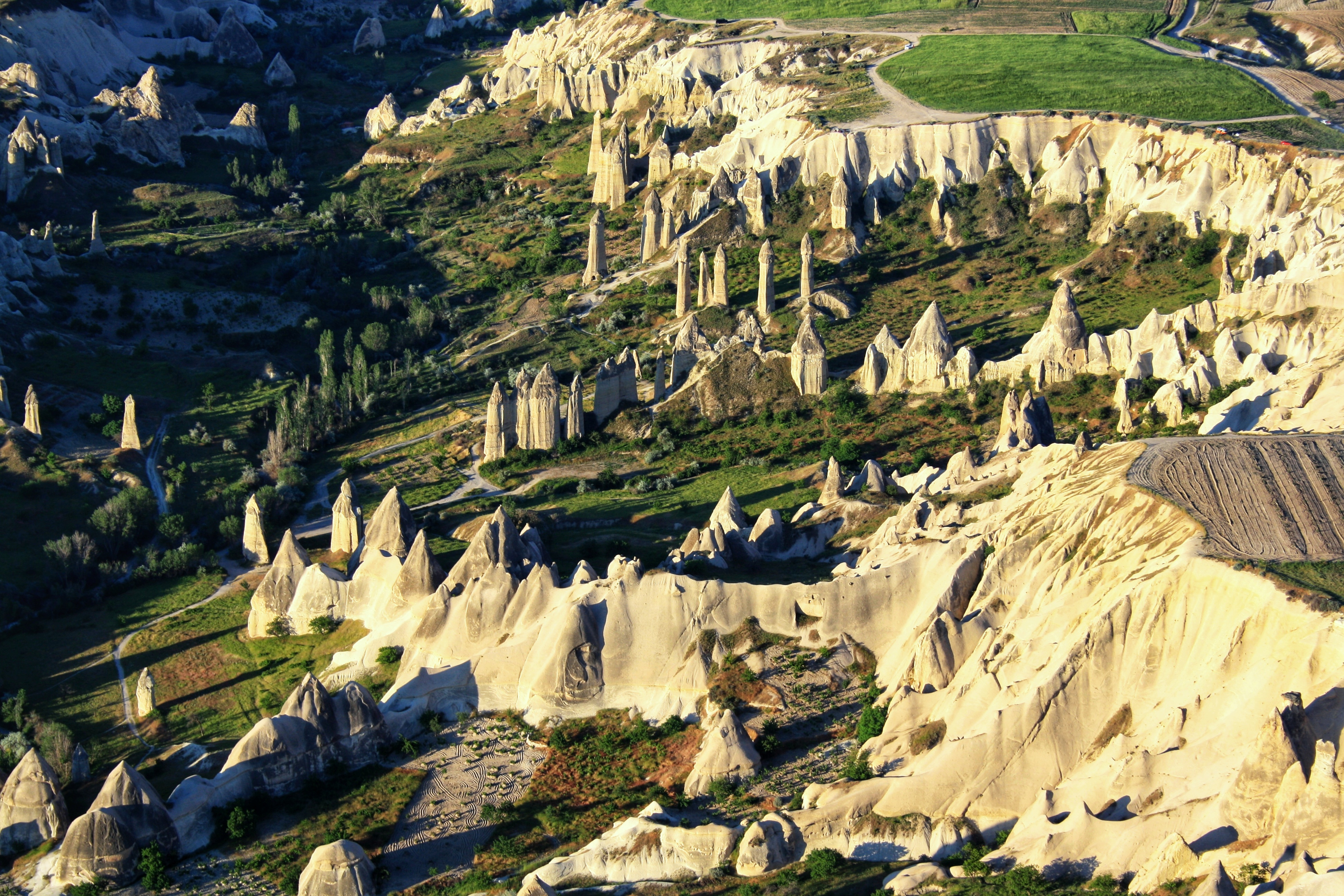
- Aerial view of Love Valley

- Location within Turkey

Geography
- Location: Göreme, Nevşehir Province, (Turkey)
- State/Province: Cappadocia
- Coordinates: 38°39′38.5″N 34°49′10.6″E
- Interactive map of Love Valley

Love Valley, (Turkish Aşıklar Vadisi) is a valley in Göreme Historical National Park, located in Cappadocia, Turkey. It is known for its rock formations called fairy chimneys.

== History ==
The history of Love Valley dates back to at least Roman times. There goes a legend that there once was two dynasties living in the same village. A fight broke out between the two dynasties, which resulted in the village effectively being split. One day, two villagers complained about the situation which resulted in the recruitment of two people from opposing sides. The two recruited soldiers fell in love with each other as soon as they saw each other. The feuding villagers, having had knowledge of this, tried their best to separate the two but failed. After they struggled to separate the two, the villagers decided to get them married. Time passed, the couple had a child, however the situation wasn't enough to reconcile the opposing families. Finally, they killed the boy. The girl couldn't stand her husband's death and later committed suicide. It is said that after the death of the two lovers, God rained stones to punish the feuding villagers. These stones are to kill anyone who opposes the reunion of youth.

A more modern explanation for the name Love Valley can be due in part to the heart-shaped fairy chimneys that dot the landscape.

Love Valley, Cappadocia

Love Valley (Turkish: Aşıklar Vadisi), located in Cappadocia, Turkey, is known for its unique rock formations called "fairy chimneys." Situated in Göreme Historical National Park, a UNESCO World Heritage Site, the valley attracts visitors with its stunning landscapes and romantic atmosphere.

The Legend of Love Valley

The valley’s name originates from a local legend of two lovers from feuding families who defied their differences. Despite their union, the conflict persisted, leading to tragedy. According to the tale, divine forces created the valley’s formations as a symbol of eternal love and a warning against discord.

Geological Highlights

Love Valley’s iconic pillars were formed over thousands of years through volcanic activity and erosion. The soft tuff rock, capped by harder basalt, created these remarkable natural sculptures.
