= Korama =

Town of ancient Cappadocia (present-day Turkey)

Coordinates: 38°27′48″N 35°15′58″E

Korama was a town of ancient Cappadocia, inhabited in Byzantine times.

Its site is located near Göreme, Asiatic Turkey.
