= Derinkuyu District =

District of Nevşehir Province, Turkey

- District
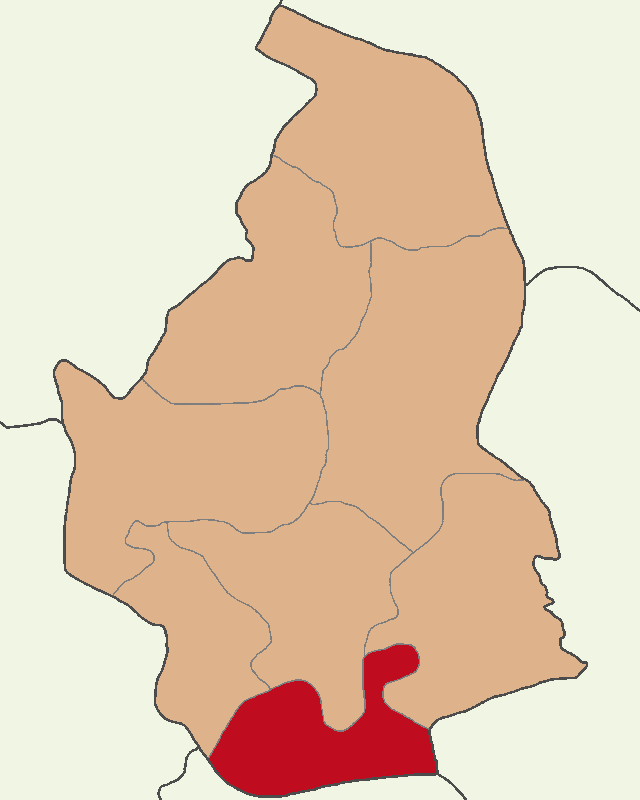
- Map showing Derinkuyu District in Nevşehir Province

- Location in Turkey Derinkuyu District (Turkey Central Anatolia)
- Coordinates: 38°22′N 34°44′E
- Country: Turkey
- Province: Nevşehir
- Seat: Derinkuyu

Government
  - Kaymakam: Esra Demirtaş
- Area: 473 km^{2} (183 sq mi)
- Population (2022): 20,676
  - Density: 44/km^{2} (110/sq mi)
- Time zone: UTC+3 (TRT)
- Website: www.derinkuyu.gov.tr

Derinkuyu District is a district of the Nevşehir Province of Turkey. Its seat is the town of Derinkuyu. Its area is 473 km^{2}, and its population is 20,676 (2022). Its highest point is Mt. Ertaş at 1,988 m (6,522 ft).

== Composition ==
There are two municipalities in Derinkuyu District:

- Derinkuyu
- Yazıhüyük

There are 7 villages in Derinkuyu District:

- Çakıllı
- Doğala
- Güneyce
- Kuyulutatlar
- Özlüce
- Suvermez
- Tilköy
