= Uçhisar =

- Municipality
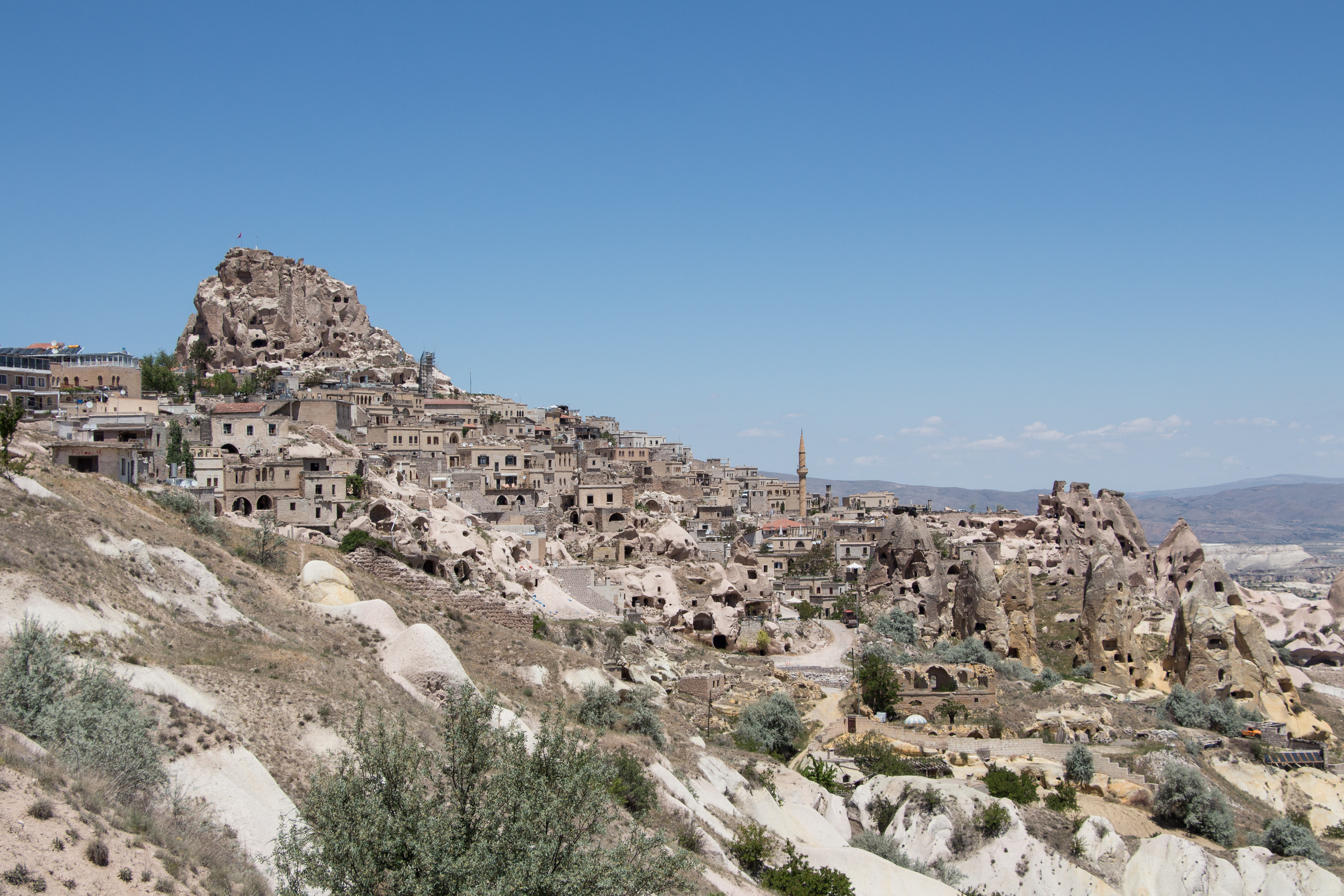
- A view of Uçhisar Castle

- Location within Turkey Location within Turkey Central Anatolia
- Coordinates: 38°37′44″N 34°48′12″E
- Country: Turkey
- Province: Nevşehir
- District: Nevşehir
- Elevation: 1,270 m (4,170 ft)
- Population (2022): 3,555
- Time zone: UTC+3 (TRT)
- Website: www.uchisar.bel.tr

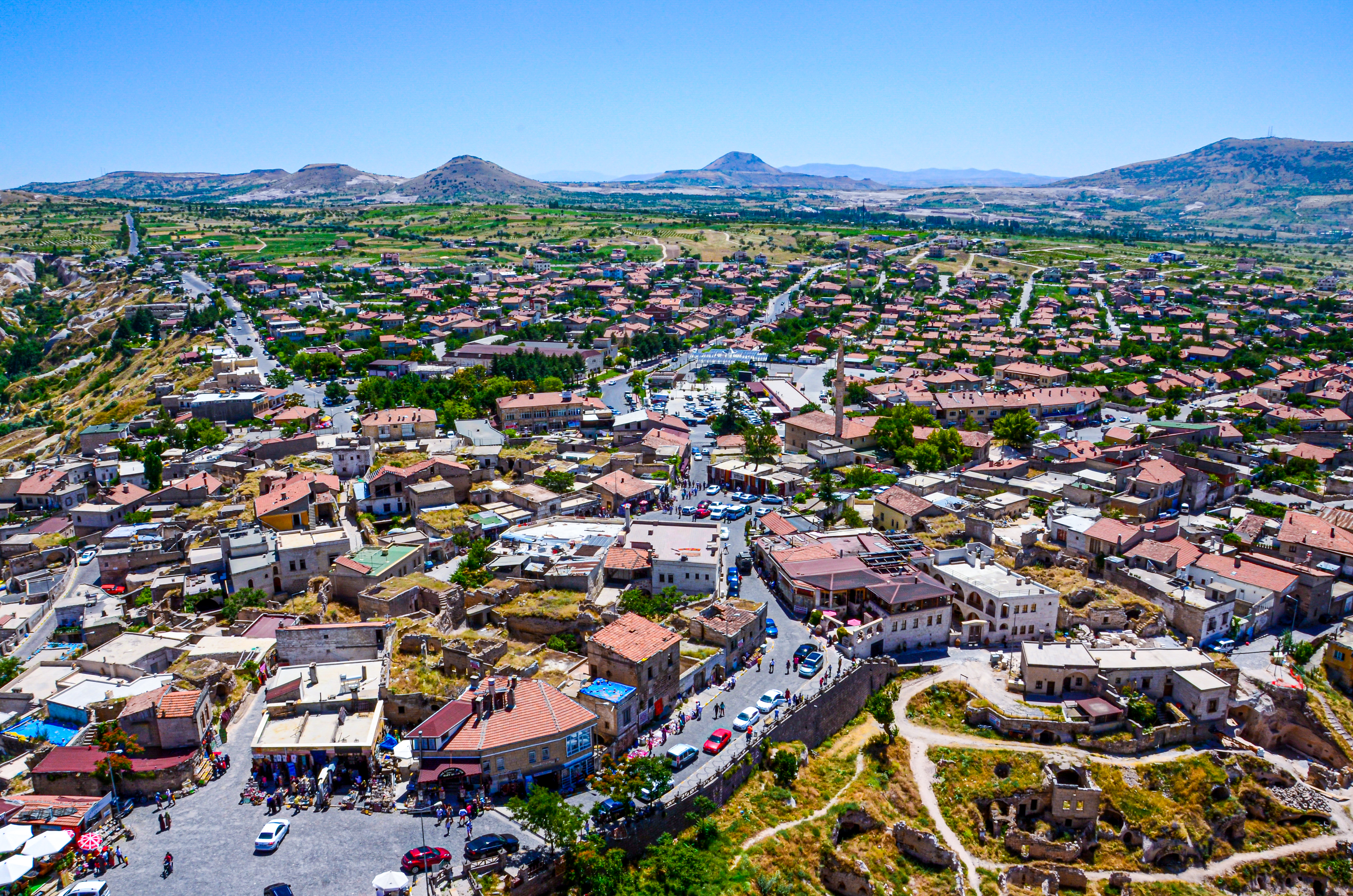
Uçhisar from the summit of Uçhisar Castle

Uçhisar is a town (belde) in the Nevşehir District, Nevşehir Province in Cappadocia, Turkey. In 2022, its population was 3,555. It is 7 km east of Nevşehir, 12 km west of Ürgüp, and 10 km south of Avanos.

Situated on the edge of Göreme National Park, Uçhisar consists of an old village huddled around the base of a huge rock cone and a new one closer to the road that runs from Nevşehir town to Göreme. Like most of Cappadocia, Uçhisar once made a living from agriculture but now depends almost entirely on tourism, with many of its fine old stone houses turned into boutique hotels. French incomers and Turks returning from France have played a large part in the move to convert the houses into hotels.

Uçhisar means "outer citadel" in Turkish and refers to the huge rock cone that is its central feature.

In antiquity, the Güvercinlik Valley that overlooks Uçhisar was known as Vasil Potamus or Vasilius (Basilius, named after St. Basil).

== History ==
Uçhisar was first mentioned in a 14th-century chronicle by Aziz ibn Ardasir. The general area had been occupied from much earlier, perhaps from Hittite times. In the seventh century AD, the Byzantines created a buffer zone in the area against Islamic expansion. The nature of the terrain was conducive to defence, while the camouflage of the buildings provided an improved defence against attackers.

After their conquest of the region, the Selçuks made use of the defensive possibilities of the area, creating small centres with caravanserais in the region.

== Attractions ==
Uçhisar is dominated by a 60-metre-high 'castle' which is actually a rock formation visible over a wide distance. Uçhisar Kalesi (Uçhisar Castle) is crisscrossed by numerous underground passageways and rooms, which are now mostly blocked or impassable. They served as residential areas and, perhaps, cloisters in Byzantine times. Perhaps around 1,000 people once lived in the castle. It is no longer inhabited today. It is open to the public and offers views from its summit.

Many fairy chimneys can be seen in and around Uçhisar. One of them houses a Jandarma (police) post.

A rock-cut church inside Uçhisar is the sixth-century Church of St Basil which is inside a rock cone and not very easy to access.

The old village is full of old stone houses, some of them with carvings on their facades. Since 2000, many of them have been converted into hotels.

In the centre of the town a tunnel extends for about 100 metres below some of the houses. It was cut out of tuff, a type of rock, in earlier times. The tunnel probably served as a link from the castle-fortress to the outside world and as a way of protecting their water supply.

The Pigeon Valley (Güverçinlik Vadisi) runs between Uçhisar and neighbouring Göreme, a walk of around two hours. Over the years, many pigeon-houses were carved into the sides of the valley. Inside were many niches where pigeons could roost. Pigeon guano was widely used as a fertiliser into the 1970s. Pigeon droppings were also used to enhance the colours of the frescoes in the cave churches.

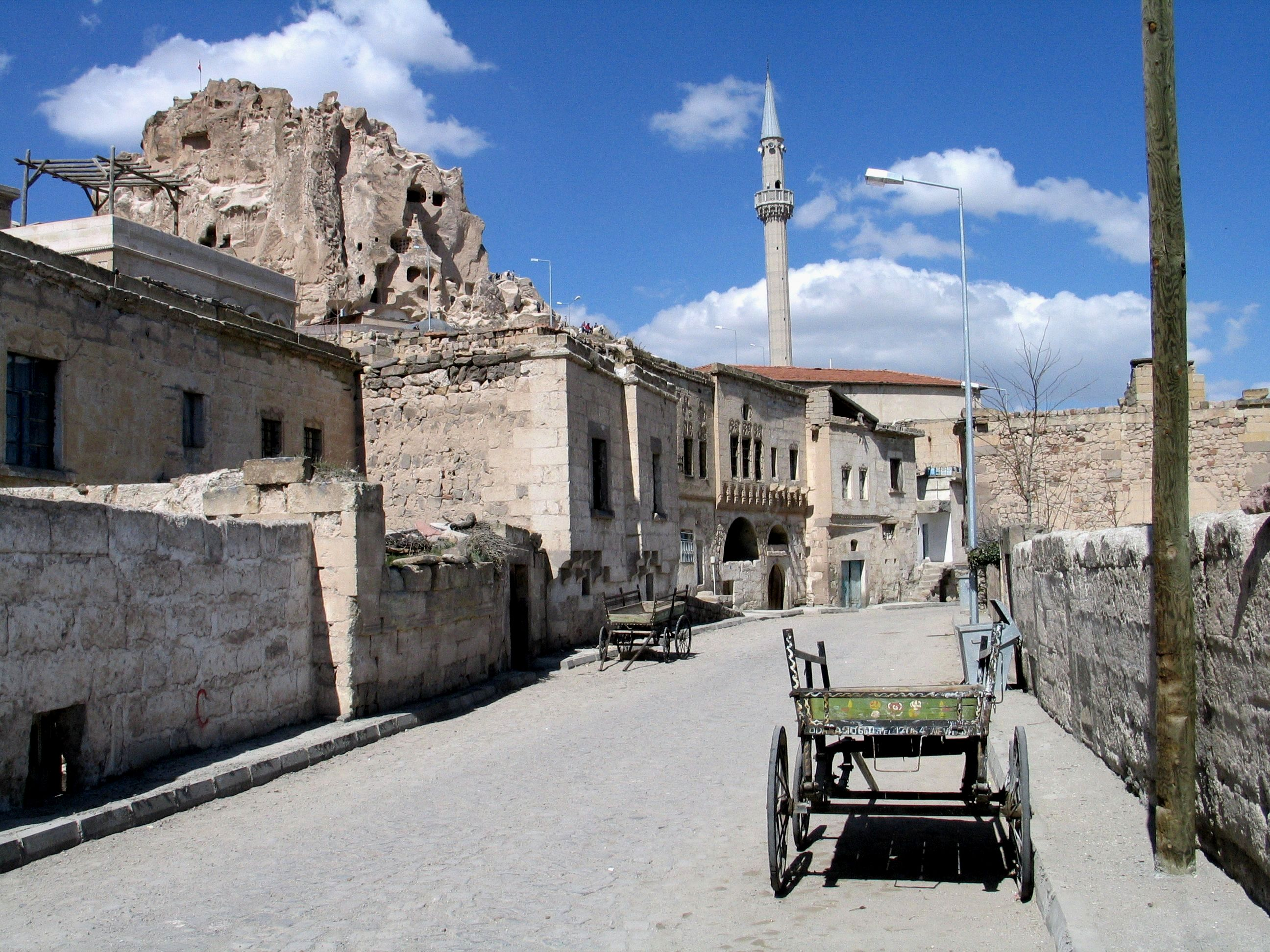
A street in the old part of Uçhisar

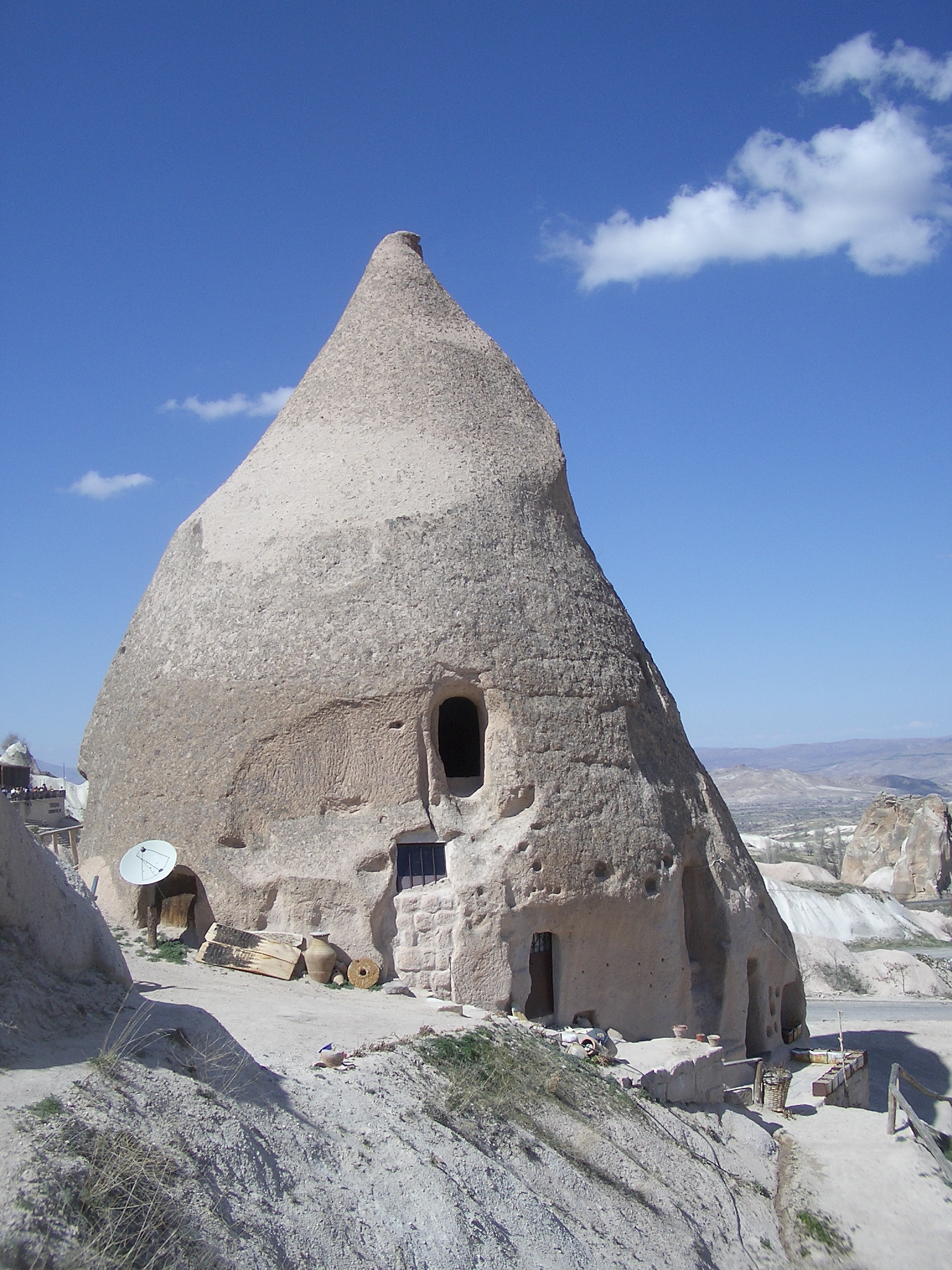
A house carved out of fairy chimney

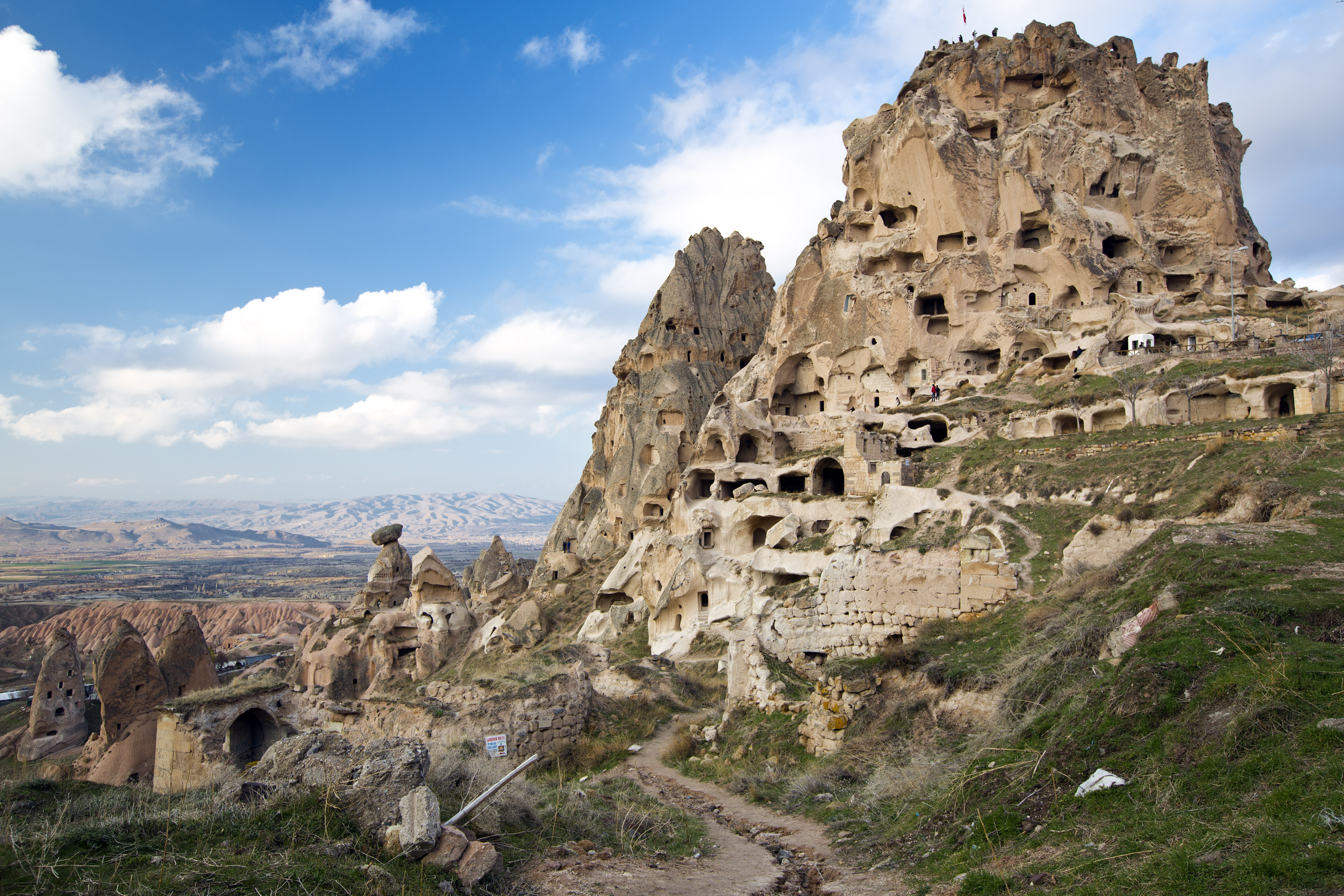
Uçhisar Kalesi (Uçhisar Castle) from the south

== See also ==
- Rock-cut architecture of Cappadocia

== Bibliography ==
- Michael Bussmann, Gabrielle Tröger: Türkische Riviera, Kappadokien. Michael Müller Verlag, Erlangen 2003, ISBN 3-89953-108-6
- Peter Daners, Volher Ohl: Kappadokien. Dumont, 1996, ISBN 3-7701-3256-4
