= Governor of Nevşehir =

Governor of a Turkish Province

Governor of Nevşehir Nevşehir Valiliği
- Incumbent; Hüseyin Kök since April 29, 2026
- Appointer: President of Turkey; On the recommendation of the Turkish government
- Term length: No set term length or limit
- Inaugural holder: Fazıl Unaydın; July 21, 1954
- Website: Office of the Governor

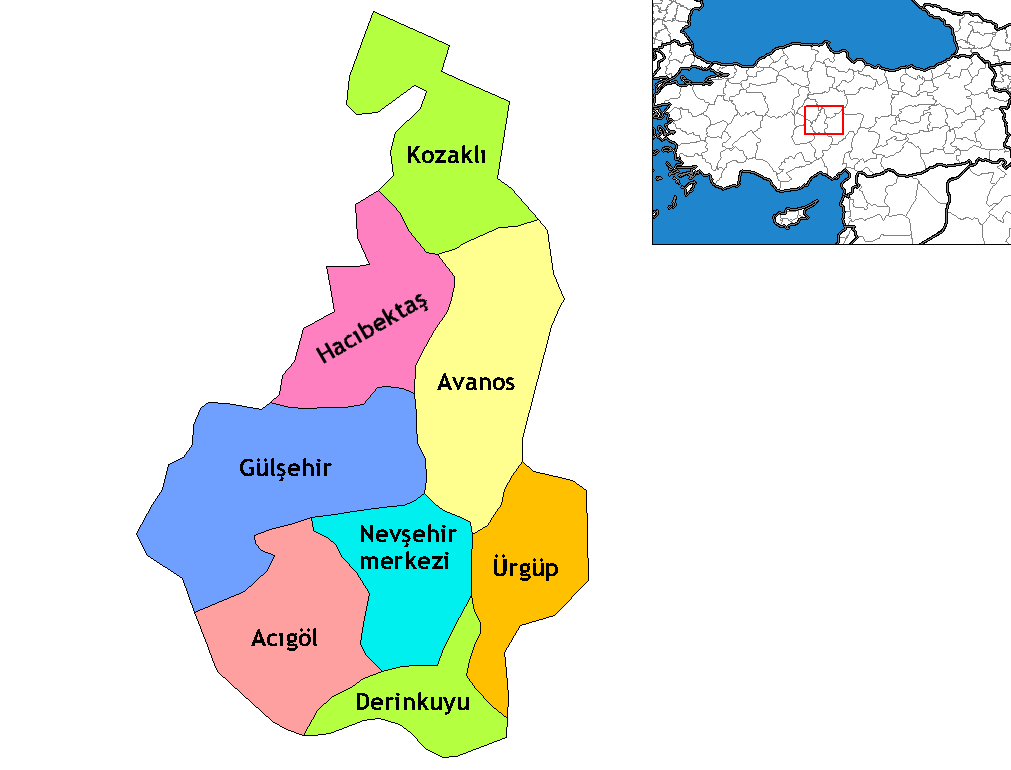
Map of the Province of Nevşehir, showing the provincial districts.

Governor of Nevşehir (Turkish: Nevşehir Valiliği) is the civil service official responsible for both national government and state affairs in the Province of Nevşehir. Similar to the Governors of the 80 other Provinces of Turkey, the Governor of Nevşehir is appointed by the Government of Turkey and is responsible for the implementation of government legislation within Nevşehir. The Governor is also the most senior commander of both the Nevşehir provincial police force and the Nevşehir Gendarmerie.

== Appointment ==
The Governor of Nevşehir is appointed by the President of Turkey, who confirms the appointment after recommendation from the Turkish Government. The Ministry of the Interior first considers and puts forward possible candidates for approval by the cabinet. The Governor of Nevşehir is therefore not a directly elected position and instead functions as the most senior civil servant in the Province of Nevşehir.

=== Term limits ===
The Governor is not limited by any term limits and does not serve for a set length of time. Instead, the Governor serves at the pleasure of the Government, which can appoint or reposition the Governor whenever it sees fit. Such decisions are again made by the cabinet of Turkey. The Governor of Nevşehir, as a civil servant, may not have any close connections or prior experience in Nevşehir Province. It is not unusual for Governors to alternate between several different Provinces during their bureaucratic career.

== Functions ==
The Governor of Nevşehir has both bureaucratic functions and influence over local government. The main role of the Governor is to oversee the implementation of decisions by government ministries, constitutional requirements and legislation passed by Grand National Assembly within the provincial borders. The Governor also has the power to reassign, remove or appoint officials a certain number of public offices and has the right to alter the role of certain public institutions if they see fit. Governors are also the most senior public official within the Province, meaning that they preside over any public ceremonies or provincial celebrations being held due to a national holiday. As the commander of the provincial police and Gendarmerie forces, the Governor can also take decisions designed to limit civil disobedience and preserve public order. Although mayors of municipalities and councillors are elected during local elections, the Governor has the right to re-organise or to inspect the proceedings of local government despite being an unelected position.

== List of governors of Nevşehir ==
- Fazıl Uybadın (1954–1955)
- Hilmi Dağcıoğlu (1955–1957)
- Ali Cemalettin Coşkun (1957–1958)
- Dr. Nafi Tamer (1958–1960)
- Şeref Tolungüç (1960)
- Rafet Yıldırım (1960–1962)
- M. Zühtü Öner (1962–1964)
- Seyit Faruk Önder (1964–1965)
- Nüzhet Erman (1966–1967)
- Mehmet Aldan (1967–1968)
- Kamil Demircioğlu (1968–1971)
- Celal Turgut Güvenç (1971–1975)
- Ahmet Başsoy (1975–1978)
- H. Ayhan Ergin (1978–1979)
- Hüsnü Tuğlu (1979–1980)
- Ahmet Başsoy (1980–1983)
- Muzaffer Yüzgeç (1983–1984)
- Dr. Süleyman Oğuz (1984–1985)
- Erdoğan Atasoy (1985–1988)
- Özdemir Hanoğlu (1988–1990)
- Aykut Ozan (1990–2002)
- Oktay Engin (1992–1993)
- Sait Eker (1993–1996)
- Şinası Kuş (1996–1998)
- Mehmet Yılmaz (1998–2000)
- Doç. Dr. Yusuf Erbay (2000–2002)
- Alaattin Turhan (2003–2006)
- M. Asım Hacımustafaoğlu (2006–2009)
- Osman Aydın (2009–2010)
- Abdurrahman Savaş (2011–2013)
- Mehmet Ceylan (2013–2016)
- İlhami Aktaş (2016–2020)
- İnci Sezer Becel (2020–2023)
- Ali Fidan (2023–2026)
- Hüseyin Kök (2026–)

== See also ==
- Governor (Turkey)
- Nevşehir Province
- Ministry of the Interior (Turkey)
