= Şahinler, Gülşehir =

Village in Turkey

Şahinler
- Village
- Location within Turkey Location within Turkey Central Anatolia
- Country: Turkey
- Province: Nevşehir
- District: Gülşehir
- Population (2022): 343
- Time zone: UTC+3 (TRT)

Şahinler is a village in Gülşehir District of Nevşehir Province, Turkey. Its population is 343 (2022). It is located 46 km (29 mi) from the town of Gülşehir proper.

== Population ==
Historical population
Year	Pop.	±% p.a.
1985	1,040	—
1990	895	−2.96%
1997	693	−3.59%
2007	575	−1.85%
2012	471	−3.91%
2017	419	−2.31%
2022	343	−3.92%
Source: 1985 census, 1990 census, 1997 census and TÜIK (2007-2022)
