= Gülşehir District =

District of Nevşehir Province, Turkey

- District
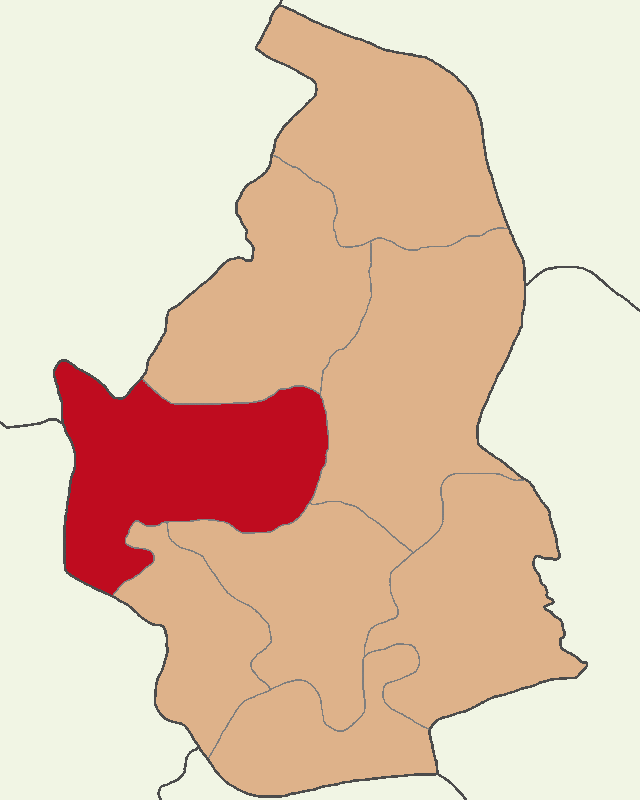
- Map showing Gülşehir District in Nevşehir Province

- Location in Turkey Gülşehir District (Turkey Central Anatolia)
- Coordinates: 38°45′N 34°37′E
- Country: Turkey
- Province: Nevşehir
- Seat: Gülşehir

Government
  - Kaymakam: Mehmet Zortul
- Area: 879 km^{2} (339 sq mi)
- Population (2022): 21,396
  - Density: 24/km^{2} (63/sq mi)
- Time zone: UTC+3 (TRT)
- Website: www.gulsehir.gov.tr

Gülşehir District is a district of the Nevşehir Province of Turkey. Its seat is the town of Gülşehir. Its area is 879 km^{2}, and its population is 21,396 (2022).

== Composition ==
There is one municipality in Gülşehir District:

- Gülşehir

There are 31 villages in Gülşehir District:

- Abuuşağı
- Alemli
- Alkan
- Bölükören
- Civelek
- Dadağı
- Eğrikuyu
- Emmiler
- Eskiyaylacık
- Fakıuşağı
- Gökçetoprak
- Gülpınar
- Gümüşkent
- Gümüşyazı
- Hacıhalilli
- Hacılar
- Hamzalı
- Karahüyük
- Kızılkaya
- Oğulkaya
- Ovaören
- Şahinler
- Terlemez
- Yakatarla
- Yalıntaş
- Yamalı
- Yeniyaylacık
- Yeşilli
- Yeşilöz
- Yeşilyurt
- Yüksekli
