= Nevşehir District =

District of Nevşehir Province, Turkey

- District
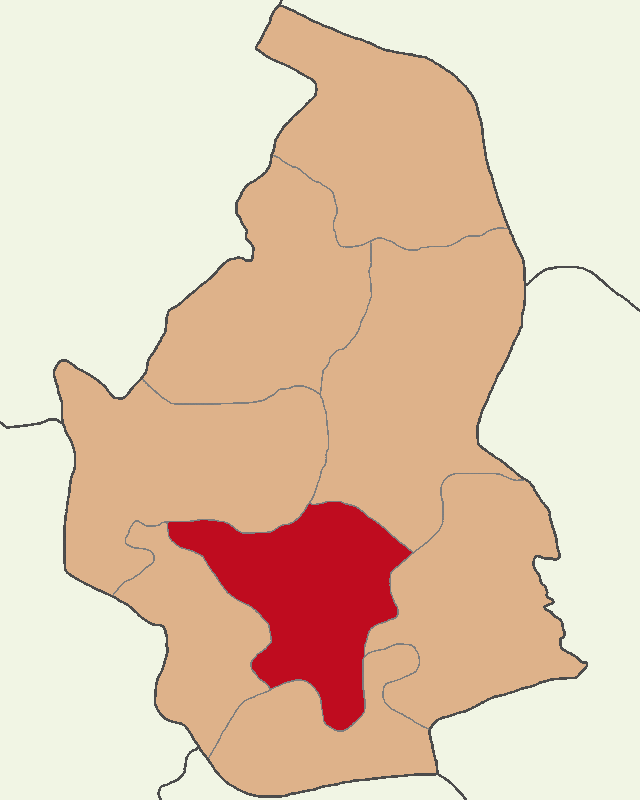
- Map showing Nevşehir District in Nevşehir Province

- Location in Turkey Nevşehir District (Turkey Central Anatolia)
- Coordinates: 38°38′N 34°43′E
- Country: Turkey
- Province: Nevşehir
- Seat: Nevşehir
- Area: 574 km^{2} (222 sq mi)
- Population (2024): 161,293
  - Density: 280/km^{2} (730/sq mi)
- Time zone: UTC+3 (TRT)

Nevşehir District (also: Merkez, meaning "central" in Turkish) is a district of the Nevşehir Province of Turkey. Its seat is the city of Nevşehir. Its area is 574 km^{2}, and its population is 161,293 (2024).

== Composition ==
There are 9 municipalities in Nevşehir District:

- Çat
- Göre
- Göreme
- Kavak
- Kaymaklı
- Nar
- Nevşehir
- Sulusaray
- Uçhisar

There are 9 villages in Nevşehir District:

- Alacaşar
- Balcın
- Basansarnıç
- Boğaz
- Çardak
- Çiftlik
- Güvercinlik
- İcik
- Özyayla
