= Yazıhüyük =

- Municipality
- Location in Turkey Yazıhüyük (Turkey Central Anatolia)
- Coordinates: 38°20′38″N 34°38′23″E
- Country: Turkey
- Province: Nevşehir
- District: Derinkuyu
- Population (2022): 3,733
- Time zone: UTC+3 (TRT)

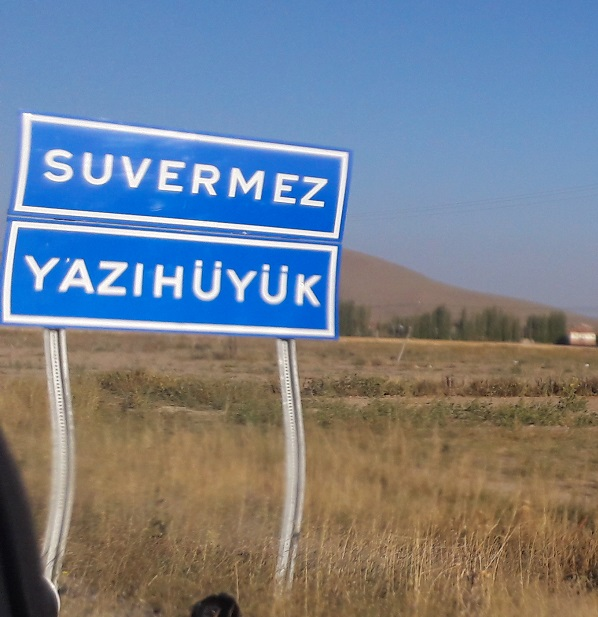
Yazıhüyük ve Suvermez tabelaları

Yazıhüyük is a town (belde) in the Derinkuyu District, Nevşehir Province, Turkey. Its population is 3,733 (2022).
