= Yakatarla, Gülşehir =

Yakatarla
- Village
- Location within Turkey Location within Turkey Central Anatolia
- Country: Turkey
- Province: Nevşehir
- District: Gülşehir
- Population (2022): 179
- Time zone: UTC+3 (TRT)

Yakatarla (formerly: Nernek) is a village in the Gülşehir District, Nevşehir Province, Turkey. Its population is 179 (2022).

== History ==
It was originally a small village named Nisa (Ancient Greek: Νίσα). Its name was later changed to Muşkara, then to Nernek, and finally to its current name of Yakatarla.

The name of the village is mentioned as Nernek in the records of 1928.

== Population ==
Historical population
Year	Pop.	±% p.a.
1985	407	—
1990	380	−1.36%
1997	311	−2.82%
2007	328	+0.53%
2012	283	−2.91%
2017	237	−3.49%
2022	179	−5.46%
Source: 1985 census, 1990 census, 1997 census and TÜIK (2007-2022)
