= Nar, Nevşehir =

Nar
- Municipality
- Location in Turkey Nar (Turkey Central Anatolia)
- Coordinates: 38°38′24″N 34°42′58″E
- Country: Turkey
- Province: Nevşehir
- District: Nevşehir
- Population (2022): 5,017
- Time zone: UTC+3 (TRT)

Nar is a town (belde) in the Nevşehir District, Nevşehir Province, Turkey. Its population is 5,017 (2022).
