= Göreme Historical National Park =

National park in Nevşehir, Turkey

- Göreme Tarihî Millî Parkı
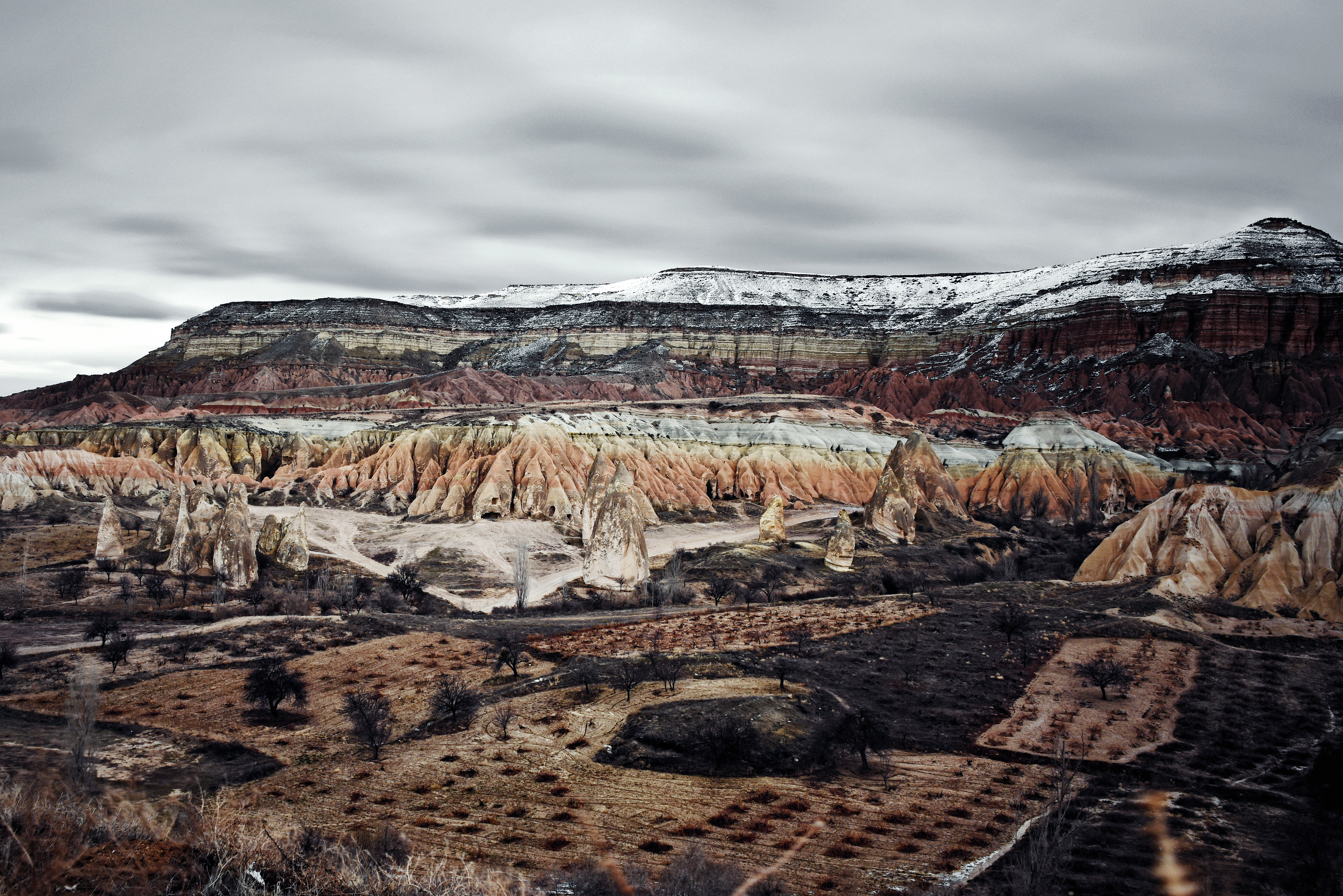

- Location within Turkey
- Location: Nevşehir Province, Turkey
- Coordinates: 38°39′10″N 34°51′47″E
- Area: 9,884 ha (24,420 acres)
- Website: Website

UNESCO World Heritage Site
- Official name: Göreme Historical National Park and the Rock Sites of Cappadocia
- Type: Mixed
- Criteria: i, iii, v, vii
- Designated: 1985 (9th session)
- Reference no.: 357
- Region: Western Asia

Göreme Historical National Park (pronounced [ˈɟœɾeme]; Turkish: Göreme Tarihî Milli Parkı) is a national park in Cappadocia in central Turkey. It occupies an area of nearly 100 km^{2} (39 sq mi) and is located in Nevşehir Province. It became a UNESCO World Heritage Site in 1985 under the name Göreme National Park and the Rock Sites of Cappadocia. The park features a rocky, water- and wind-eroded landscape with a network of ancient, interconnecting underground settlements.

== Description ==
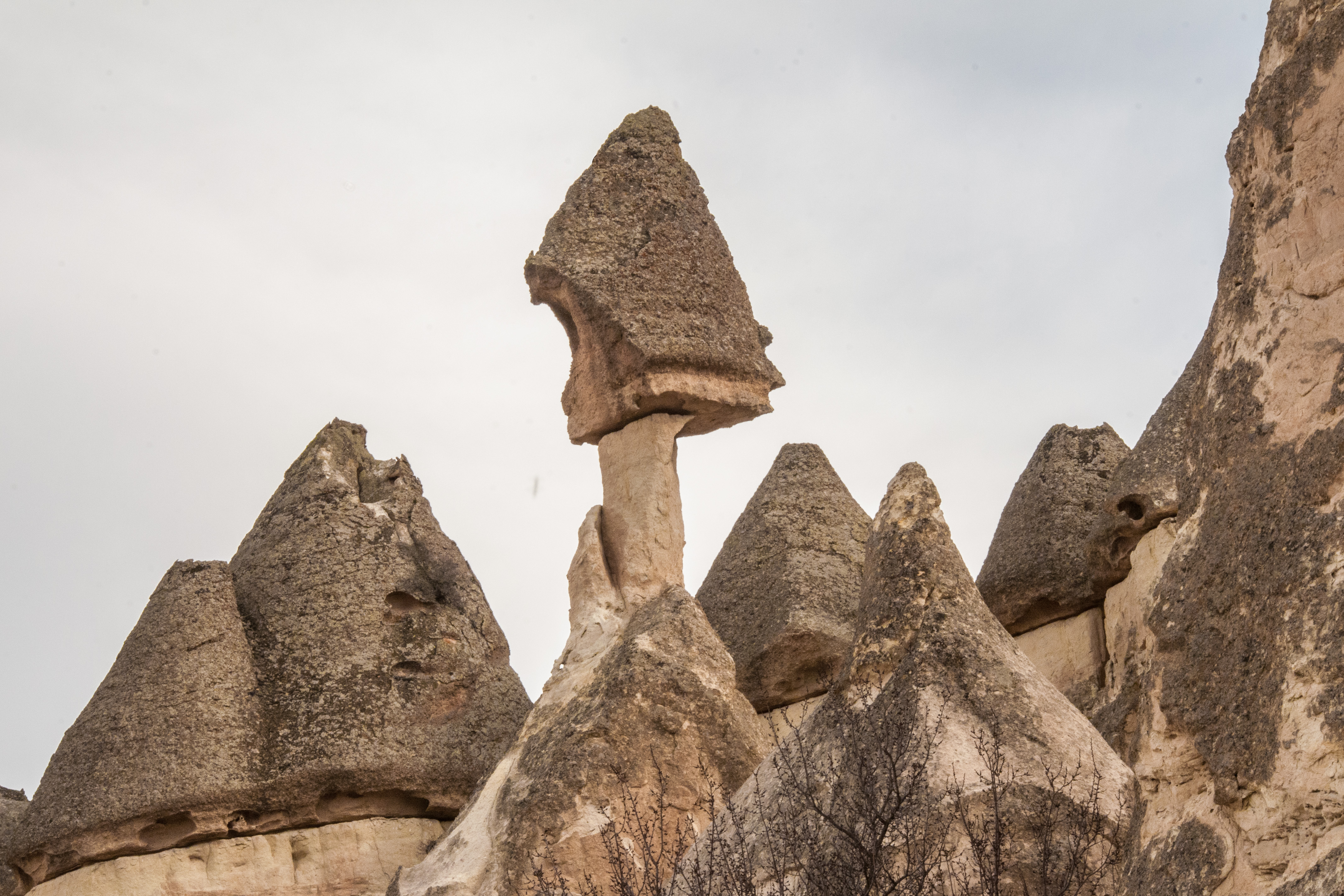
Tent rocks (peribacası) near Çavuşin

The National Park is located in the volcanic region of Mount Hasan and Mount Erciyes in Central Anatolia, in the vicinity of Ürgüp, Çavuşin, and Göreme. The park area consists of plateaus and high hills, dissected by streams and river valleys carved by water, with steeply sloping sides. Part of this rugged area consists of basalt and thick beds of tuff. The tuff is the result of ash emitted from volcanoes millions of years ago, which solidified into soft rock, and has since been overlain by solidified lava, which forms a protective capping. This has been eroded over the millennia to form the multi-coloured cliffs, rock towers, pillars, tent rocks and fairy chimneys present in the park. Love Valley is known for its fairy chimneys. This area experiences annual precipitation of 380 mm (15 in) and there is little vegetation except in riverine corridors.

The earliest signs of monastic activity in Cappadocia can be traced back to the 4th century, when small anchorite communities, following the teachings of Basileios the Great, Bishop of Caesarea (now Kayseri), began to inhabit the cells hewn into the rock. Later, the communities took refuge together in underground villages to avoid attacks by marauding Arabs.

== Underground dwellings ==
People have used the soft tuff rock to hollow out underground dwellings. The earliest monastic activity in Cappadocia is thought to have occurred in the fourth century, when anchorites began hewing out cells from the rock. To resist Arab marauders, they linked these cells and created underground communities with chapels, storerooms, and living quarters. Villages and small towns were developed in this way, and by 842, underground churches were being richly decorated with coloured paintings.

Nowadays, people don't live far underground as they did in the past, when they were hiding or fleeing enemies. But some people still live in cave dwellings that have been made into homes, with a door/opening to daylight at ground level. Unfortunately, it has been found that long-term cave dwellers experience an unexpectedly high incidence of mesothelioma, a form of cancer. This has been linked to the inhalation of erionite fibres, a mineral common in tuff formations.

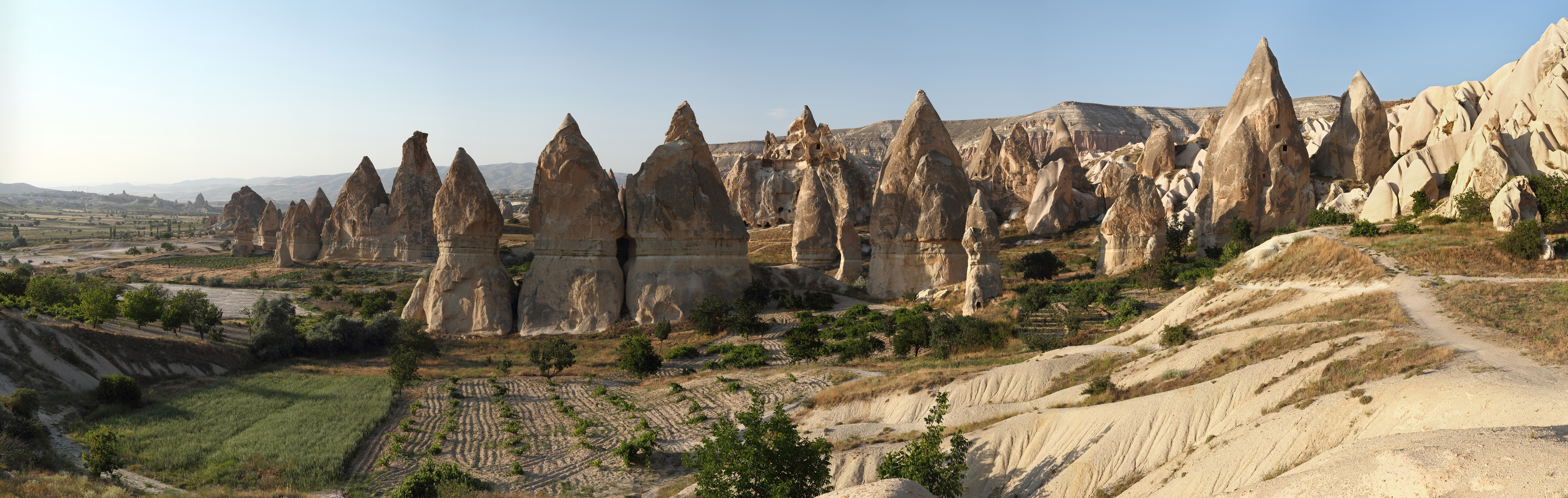
Panoramic view of fairy chimneys in Göreme Historical National Park
