= Kaymaklı, Nevşehir =

Kaymaklı
- Municipality
- Location in Turkey Kaymaklı (Turkey Central Anatolia)
- Coordinates: 38°27′56″N 34°45′02″E
- Country: Turkey
- Province: Nevşehir
- District: Nevşehir
- Population (2022): 4,315
- Time zone: UTC+3 (TRT)

Kaymaklı is a town (belde) in the Nevşehir District, Nevşehir Province, Turkey. Its population is 4,315 (2022). It is the site of the Kaymakli Underground City.
