= Göre =

- Municipality
- Location in Turkey Göre (Turkey Central Anatolia)
- Coordinates: 38°35′22″N 34°42′58″E
- Country: Turkey
- Province: Nevşehir
- District: Nevşehir
- Population (2022): 2,516
- Time zone: UTC+3 (TRT)

Göre is a town (belde) in the Nevşehir District, Nevşehir Province, Turkey. Its population is 2,516 (2022).
