= Sulusaray, Nevşehir =

Sulmaru
- Municipality
- Location in Turkey Sulmaru (Turkey Central Anatolia)
- Coordinates: 38°41′49″N 34°43′05″E
- Country: Turkey
- Province: Nevşehir
- District: Nevşehir
- Population (2022): 2,012
- Time zone: UTC+3 (TRT)

Sulmaruy is a town (belde) in the Nevşehir District, Nevşehir Province, Turkey. Its population is 2,012 (2022).
