= Çat, Nevşehir =

Çat
- Municipality
- Location in Turkey Çat (Turkey Central Anatolia)
- Coordinates: 38°40′37″N 34°39′23″E
- Country: Turkey
- Province: Nevşehir
- District: Nevşehir
- Population (2022): 2,031
- Time zone: UTC+3 (TRT)
- Website: www.cat.bel.tr

Çat is a town (belde) in the Nevşehir District, Nevşehir Province, Turkey. Its population is 2,031 (2022).
