= Kavak, Nevşehir =

Kavak
- Municipality
- Location in Turkey Kavak (Turkey Central Anatolia)
- Coordinates: 38°34′29″N 34°49′17″E
- Country: Turkey
- Province: Nevşehir
- District: Nevşehir
- Population (2022): 2,587
- Time zone: UTC+3 (TRT)

Kavak is a town (belde) in the Nevşehir District, Nevşehir Province, Turkey. Its population is 2,587 (2022).
