= Göreme =

- Municipality
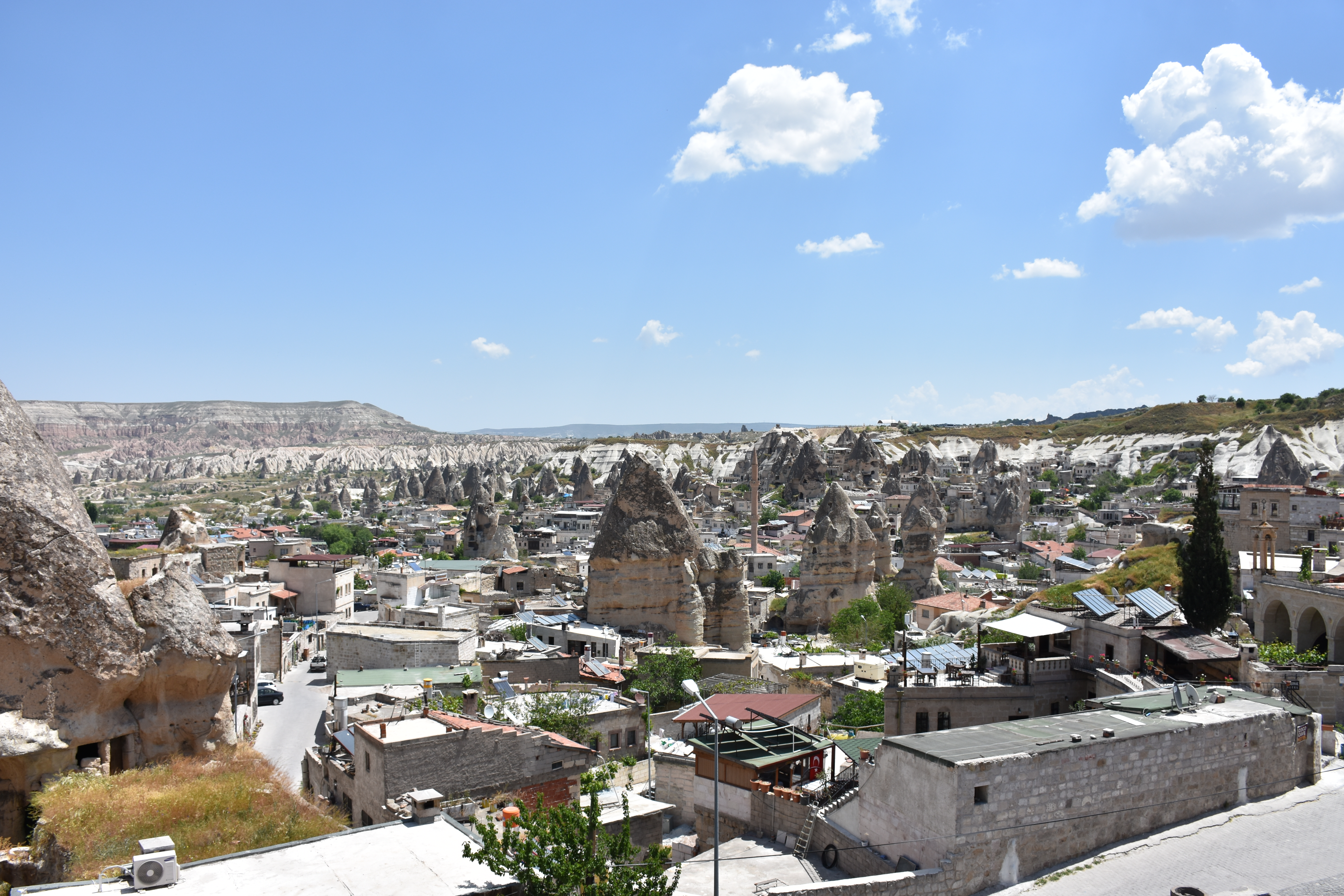
- View of Göreme town

- Location within Turkey Location within Turkey Central Anatolia
- Coordinates: 38°38′35″N 34°49′44″E
- Country: Turkey
- Province: Nevşehir
- District: Nevşehir
- Elevation: 1,104 m (3,622 ft)
- Population (2022): 2,034
- Time zone: UTC+3 (TRT)
- Website: goreme.bel.tr

Göreme (Turkish: [ɟœˈɾeme]; Ancient Greek: Κόραμα, romanized: Kòrama) is a town (belde) in the Nevşehir District, Nevşehir Province in Central Anatolia, Turkey. Its population is 2,034 (2022). It is well known for its fairy chimneys (Turkish: peribacalar), eroded rock formations, many of which were hollowed out in the Middle Ages to create Christian churches, houses and underground cities. Göreme was formerly known as Korama, Matiana, Macan and Avcilar.

Göreme sits at the heart of a network of valleys filled with astonishing rock formations. Being a centre of early Christianity, it also has the most painted churches, as well as hermitages and monasteries, in Cappadocia.

Once an agricultural settlement, modern Göreme is best known for its flourishing tourism industry, in particular for its hot air balloon rides, and many boutique hotels created out of old cave homes, in addition to ecclesiastical structures connected to its early Christian heritage. The village sits within the Göreme National Park which was added to the UNESCO World Heritage List in 1985.

The nearest airports are Nevşehir Kapadokya Airport and Kayseri Airport. The village is also served by long-distance buses from all over Turkey.

== Etymology ==
The name Korama was given by early Christians, with gor emi meaning 'you cannot see this place' in reference to the area serving as a hidden place of shelter during periods of persecution.

== History ==
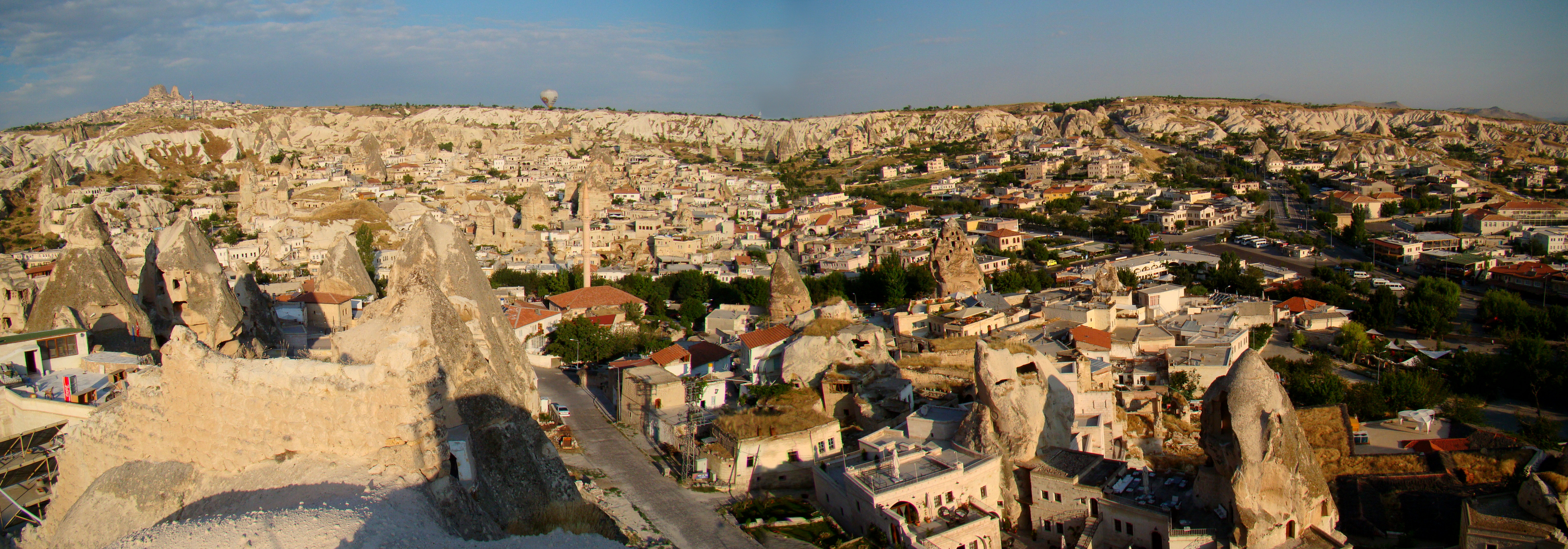
Panorama of the town of Göreme

Göreme was an important centre of early Christianity. Very little is known about Göreme's history until modern times in part because it was a small settlement away from the more travelled main roads linking Kayseri to Konya and the Mediterranean coast to Aksaray. The village contains several pillared tombs believed to date back to Roman times. In Byzantine times what is now Göreme was actually two separate but adjacent villages: Korama (Greek: Κόραμα) where the modern Open Air Museum can be found, and Matiana/Macan (Μάτιανα) where the modern village is. The first written record of Matiana and Korama appears in the proceedings of the Council of Chalcedon in 451 which was attended by representatives of both the settlements. A Life of St Hieron, the patron saint of Göreme, written in the sixth century nevertheless refers to events in the third century and offers the first mention of villagers living in cave houses. Some of the simpler cave churches around the village date from the sixth and seventh centuries, others from the tenth and eleventh centuries which is also when many of the frescoes were painted.

In 1796, the Mehmet Paşa Konağı (Mehmet Paşa Mansion) was constructed in Göreme, although the true name of the original owner is unknown. The walls of its selamlık (men's room) and haremlik (women's room) are completely covered with murals, those in the men's room featuring images of Constantinople mosques and landscapes, those in the women's room more domestic.

The first Westerner writer to leave an account – and drawing – of Göreme was the French archaeologist Charles Texier who passed through in the 1830s. In a book based on his travels in 1837 Sir William Hamilton referred to the chapel of St Hieron and the so-called Roma Kalesi (Roman Castle) in Göreme.

The native Cappadocian Greek inhabitants relocated to Greece following the 1923 Population exchange.

=== Troglodytism ===
The malleable nature of the rocks and cones in and around Göreme has meant that people have carved out cave homes here from at least the third century (and probably from long before). The earliest such homes were probably simple caves but by the 20th century most of the houses (except those in single cones) had stone rooms built in front of the caves for families to live in while the caves were relegated to stabling and storage. The houses were designed to suit a place-specific way of life, with mangers for the animals cut from the rock along with presses used to tread grapes and later to make pekmez (grape molasses). Tandır ovens cut into the floors doubled as heating. This was a way of life that continued right into the first decade of the 21st century but that came to an effective end as a result of a tourism boom that saw almost all the old houses converted into boutique hotels by around 2015.

=== Tourism ===
Göreme was little visited by tourists until the 1970s but by 2000 had become the tourist capital of Cappadocia. Tourism brought wealth and a better standard of living to the village but it has completely changed not just the use of the old cave buildings within the village which have almost all been converted into hotels but also the lives of the villagers, almost all of whom now work in tourism. Many erstwhile residents have moved to live in the surrounding towns and villages – Nevşehir, Avanos, Uçhisar and Ürgüp – having sold their houses in Göreme for conversion into hotels. In the second decade of the 21st century an increasing number of hotels started to be built or bought by investors from outside Göreme.

== Gallery ==
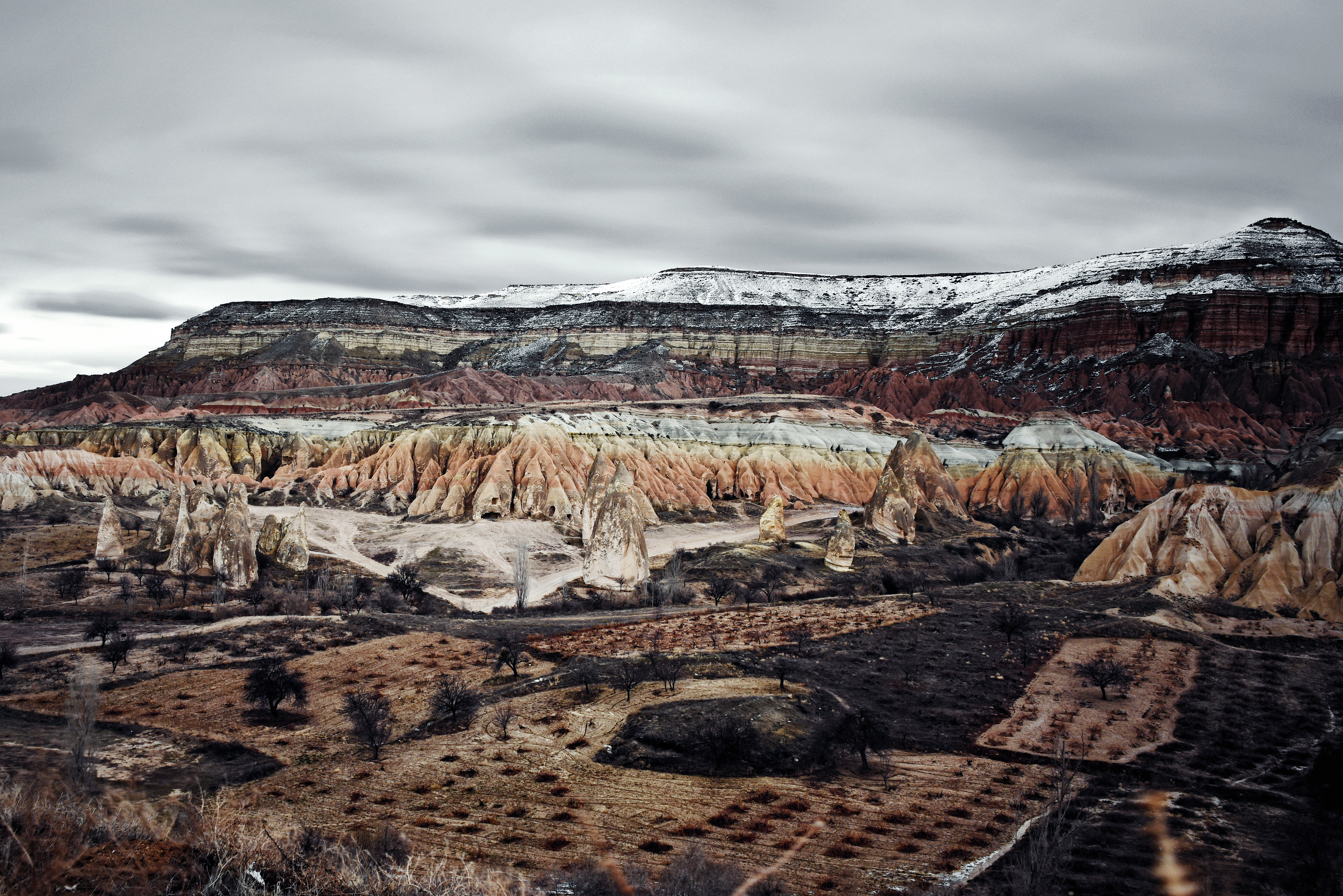
Göreme Historical National Park

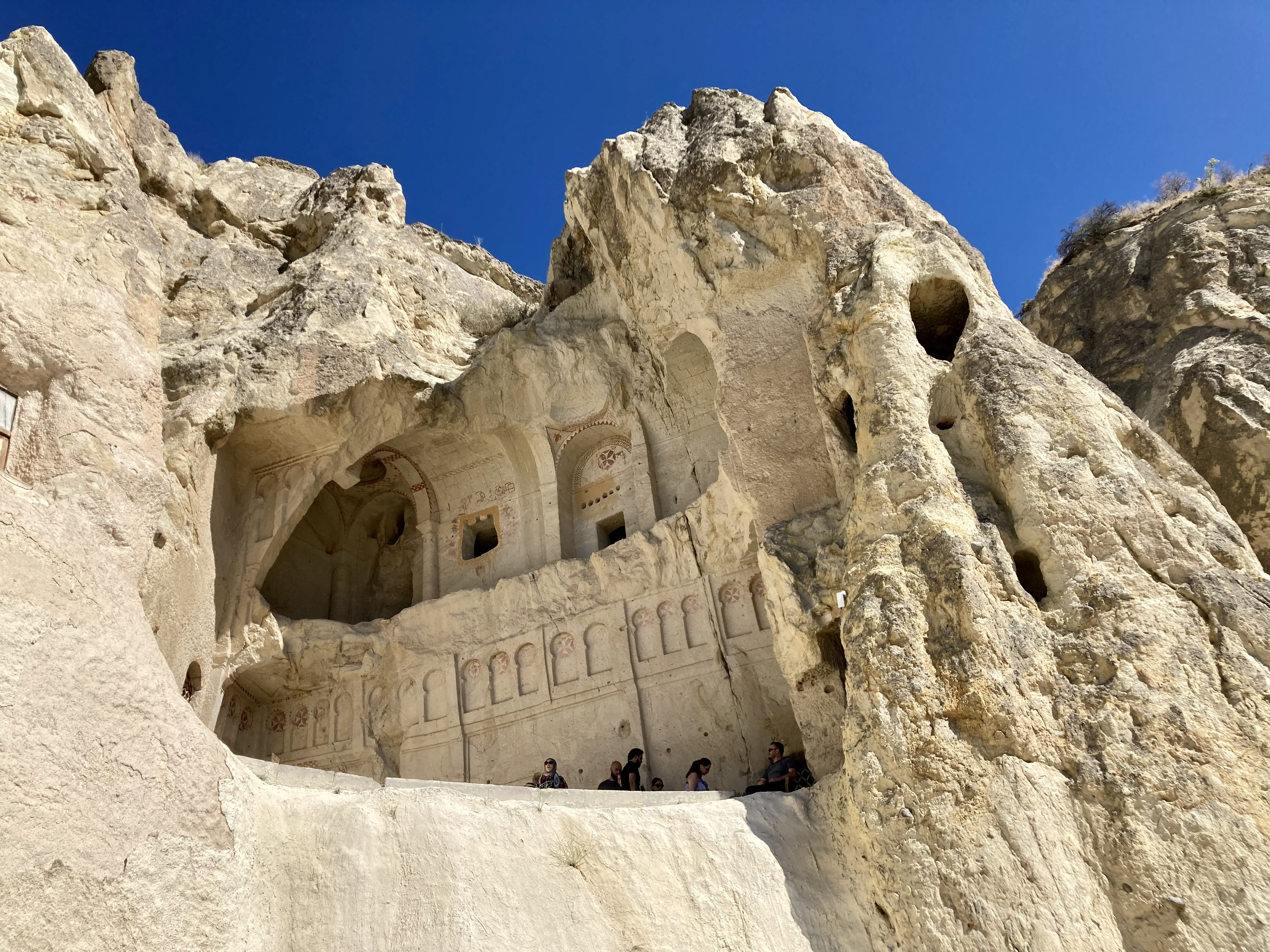
The Karanlık (Dark) Church

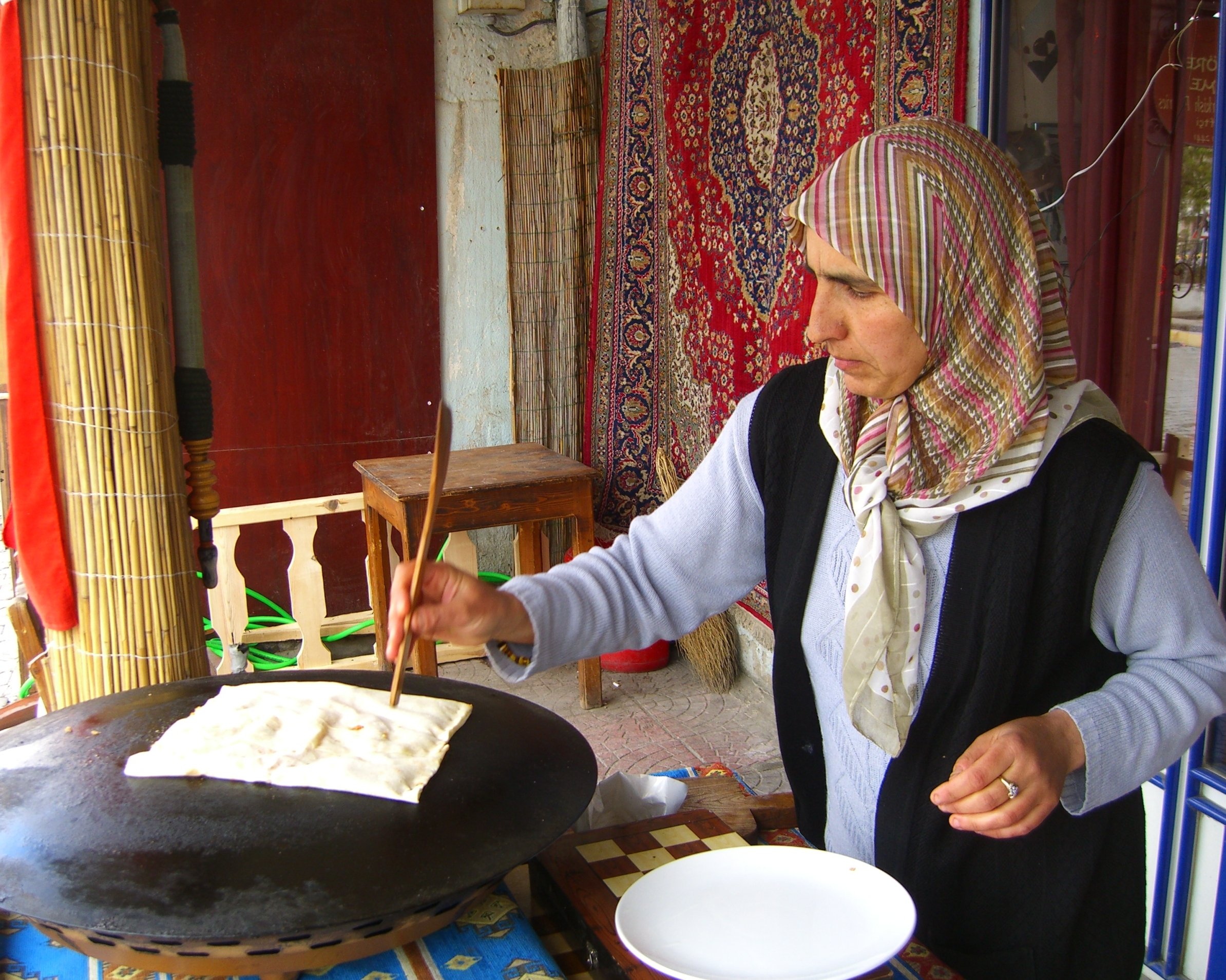
Göreme cafe owner making flatbread

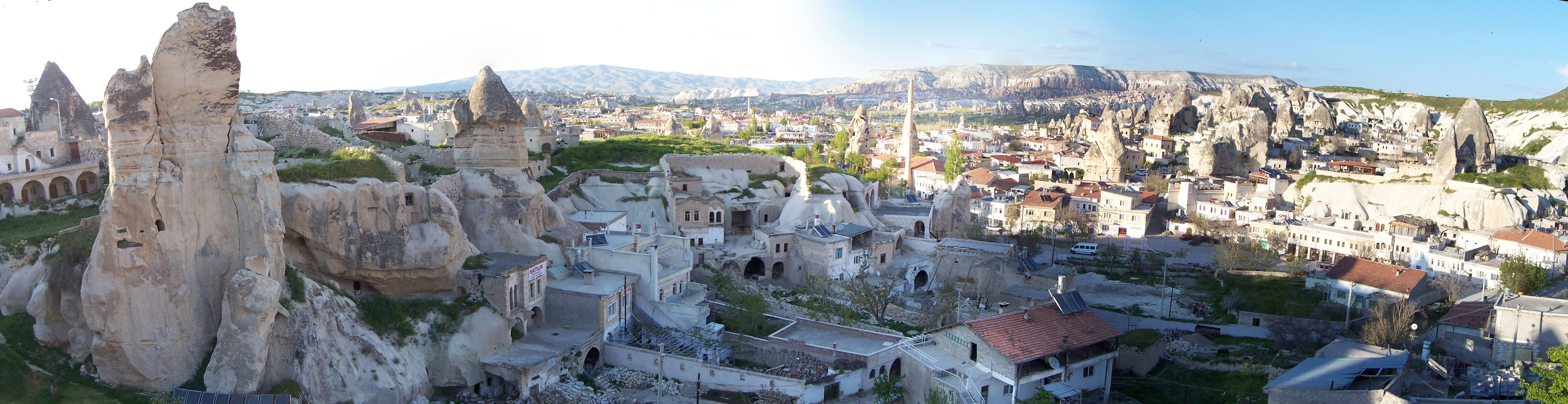
View of Göreme

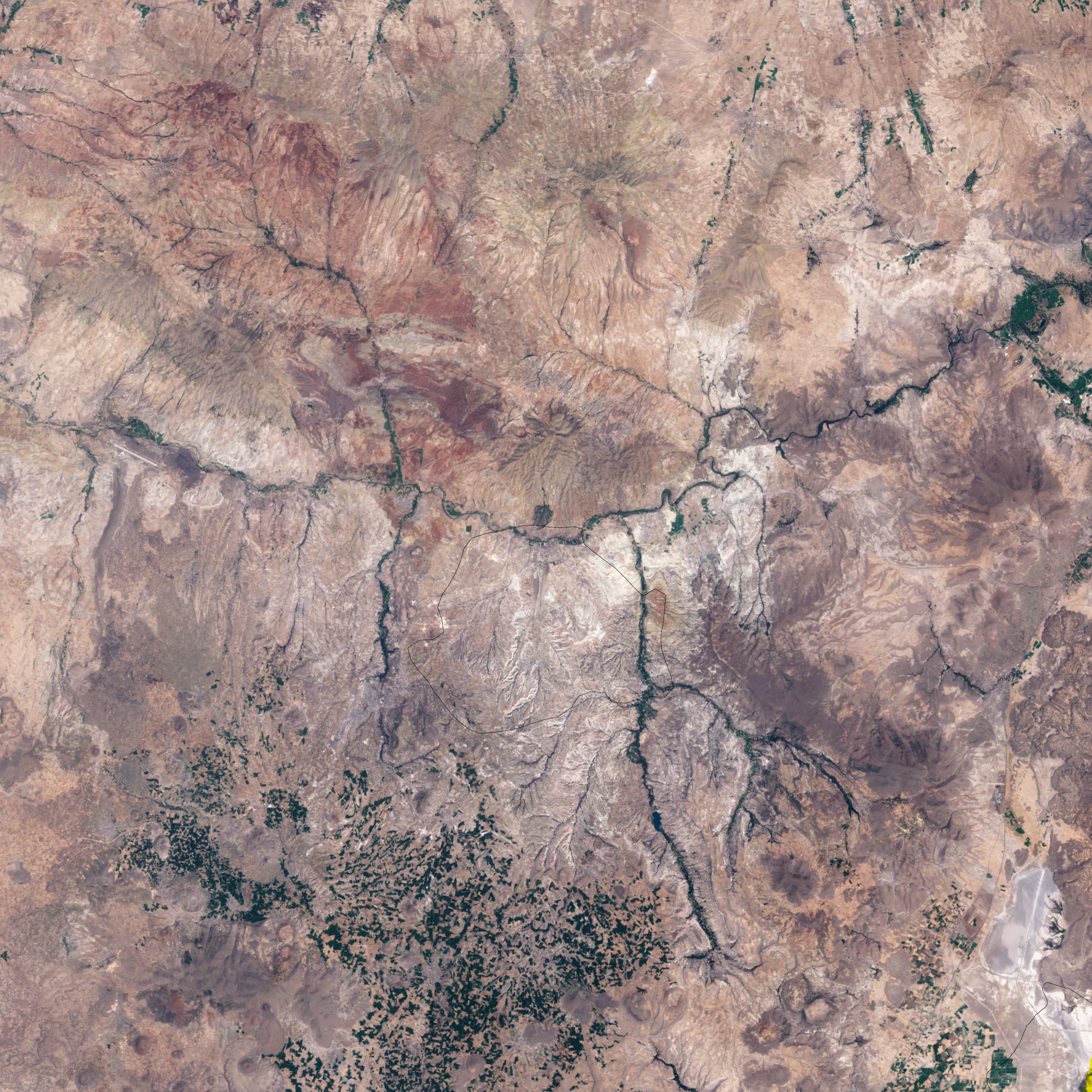
Göreme national park as seen from space

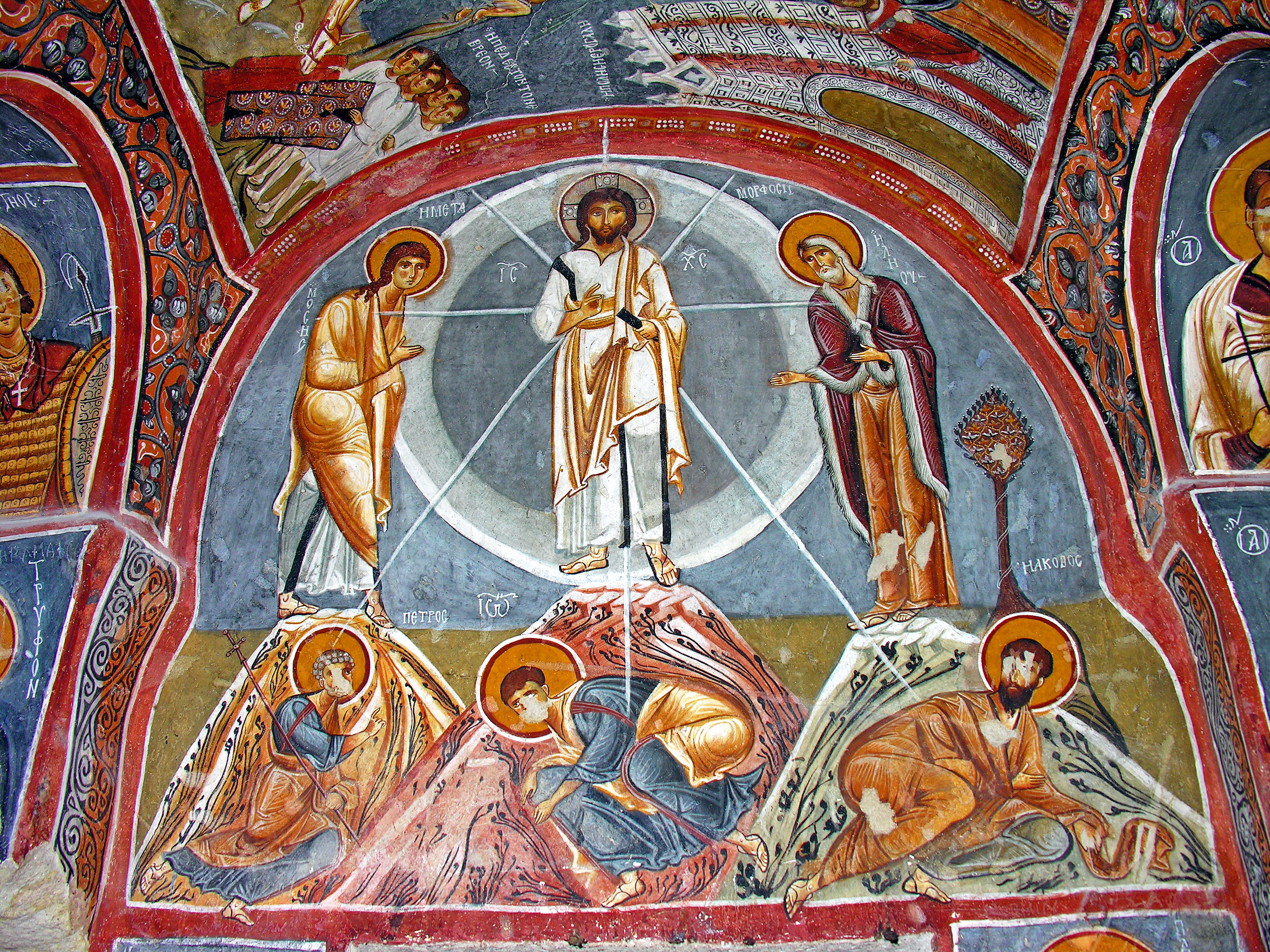
The Karanlık (Dark) Church, one of the finest frescoed churches within Göreme Open Air Museum.
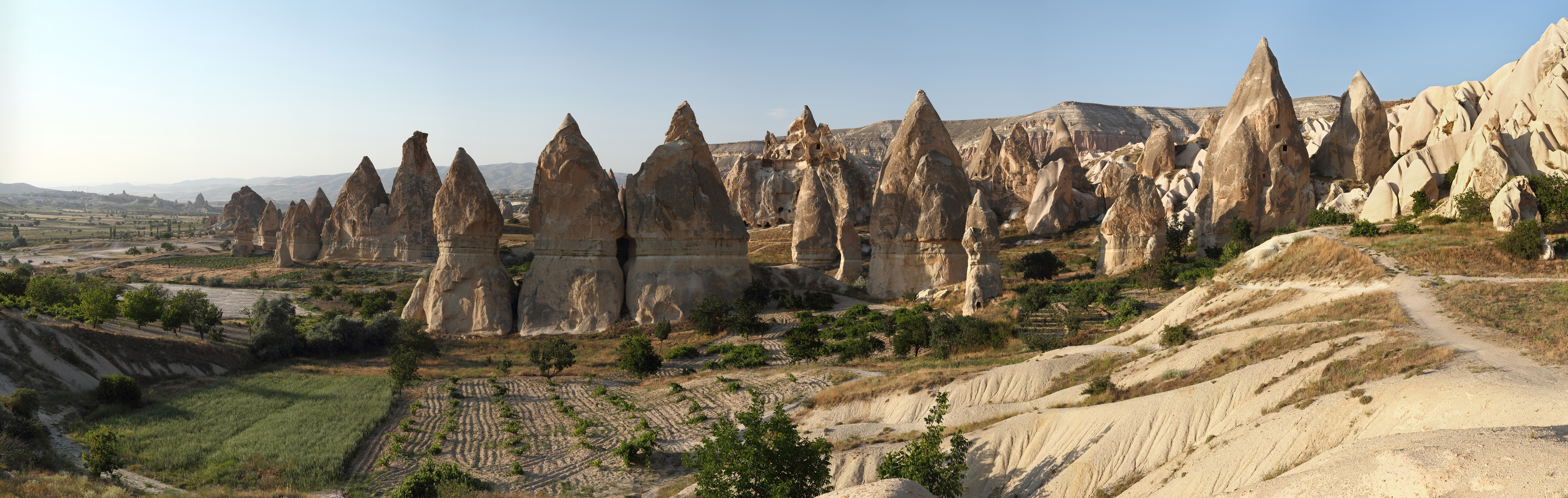
Panoramic view of the Fairy Chimneys in Göreme National Park

== See also ==
- Churches of Göreme, Turkey
- Churches of the Ihlara Valley
- Ürgüp
