= Nevşehir Kapadokya Airport =

Nevşehir Kapadokya Airport Nevşehir Kapadokya Havalimanı
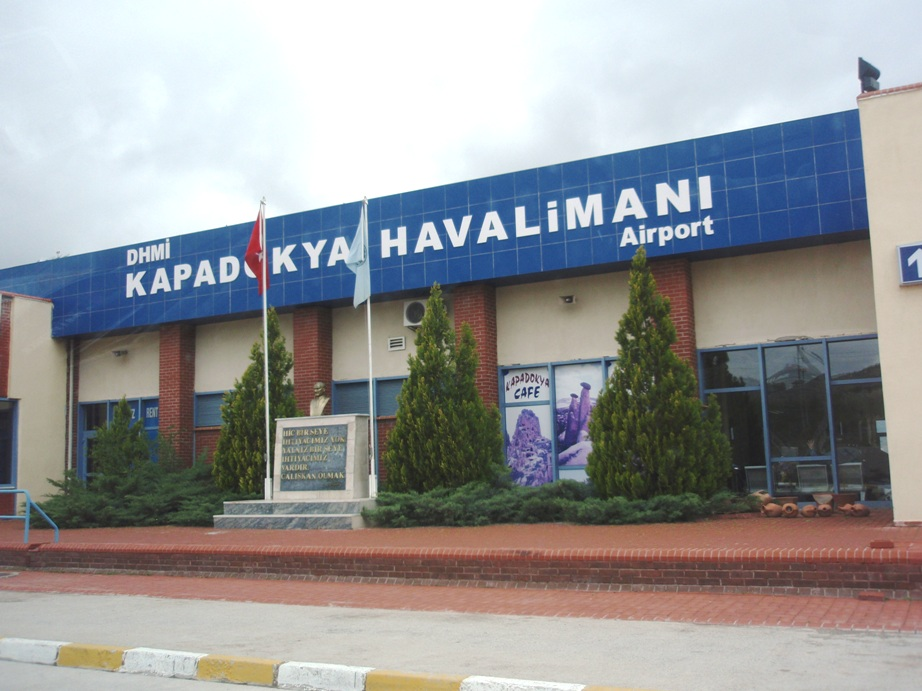
- IATA: NAV; ICAO: LTAZ

Summary
- Airport type: Public
- Operator: General Directorate of State Airports Authority
- Serves: Nevşehir, Turkey
- Location: Gülşehir, Nevşehir, Turkey
- Opened: 15 November 1998; 27 years ago
- Elevation AMSL: 3,090 ft (940 m)
- Coordinates: 38°46′08″N 34°31′35″E
- Website: www.dhmi.gov.tr

Map
- Location of airport in Turkey NAV (Asia)

Runways
Direction	Length		Surface
Direction	ft	m	Surface
11/29	9,842	3,000	Concrete

Statistics (2025)
- Annual passenger capacity: 2,000,000
- Passengers: 754,489
- Passenger change 2024–25: ▲5%
- Aircraft movements: 20,986
- Movements change 2024–25: ▲25%

Nevşehir Kapadokya Airport (IATA: NAV, ICAO: LTAZ) is an airport in the northwest of Nevşehir, Turkey.

== History ==
The airport was opened on 15 November 1988 as Nevşehir Tuzköy Airfield. On 17 December 1998, the airfield renamed as Nevşehir Kapadokya Airport. In 2006, the airport served 392 cargo, 833 passenger aircraft and 27,832 passengers. The airport's domestic and international passenger terminal covers an area of 3,500 m^{2} and has a parking lot for 400 cars.

== Airlines and destinations ==
The following airlines operate regular scheduled and charter flights at Nevşehir Kapadokya Airport:

Airlines	Destinations
AJet	Istanbul–Sabiha Gökçen
Turkish Airlines	Istanbul

== Traffic Statistics ==
Nevşehir–Kapadokya Airport Statistics
Year (months)	Domestic	% change	International	% change	Total	% change
2025	748,550	▲5%	5,939	▼20%	754,489	▲5%
2024	714,547	▲30%	7,395	▼54%	721,942	▲28%
2023	548,168	▲31%	16,152	▲9%	564,320	▲30%
2022	419,383	▲69%	14,771	▼1%	434,154	▲65%
2021	247,546	▲87%	14,894	▲882%	262,440	▲96%
2020	132,619	▼73%	1,516	▼62%	134,135	▼73%
2019	490,125	▲30%	3,960	▲51%	494,085	▲30%
2018	378,085	▲197%	2,625	▲438%	380,710	▲198%
2017	127,381	▼65%	488	▼78%	127,869	▼65%
2016	365,544	▲2%	2,196	▼38%	367,740	▲1%
2015	359,106	▲21%	3,549	▲137%	362,655	▲22%
2014	296,036	▲52%	1,496	▼42%	297,532	▲51%
2013	194,234	▲26%	2,594	▼87%	196,828	▲13%
2012	153,776	▲20%	20,202	▼33%	173,978	▲10%
2011	127,730	▲31%	30,062	▼26%	157,792	▲14%
2010	97,474	▲17%	40,435	▲2%	137,909	▲12%
2009	83,109	▲53%	39,644	▼15%	122,753	▲22%
2008	54,190	▲91%	46,572	▲81%	100,762	▲86%
2007	28,343	Steady	25,711	Steady	54,054	Steady
