= Nevşehir Province =

Province of Turkey

Nevşehir Province Nevşehir ili
- Province
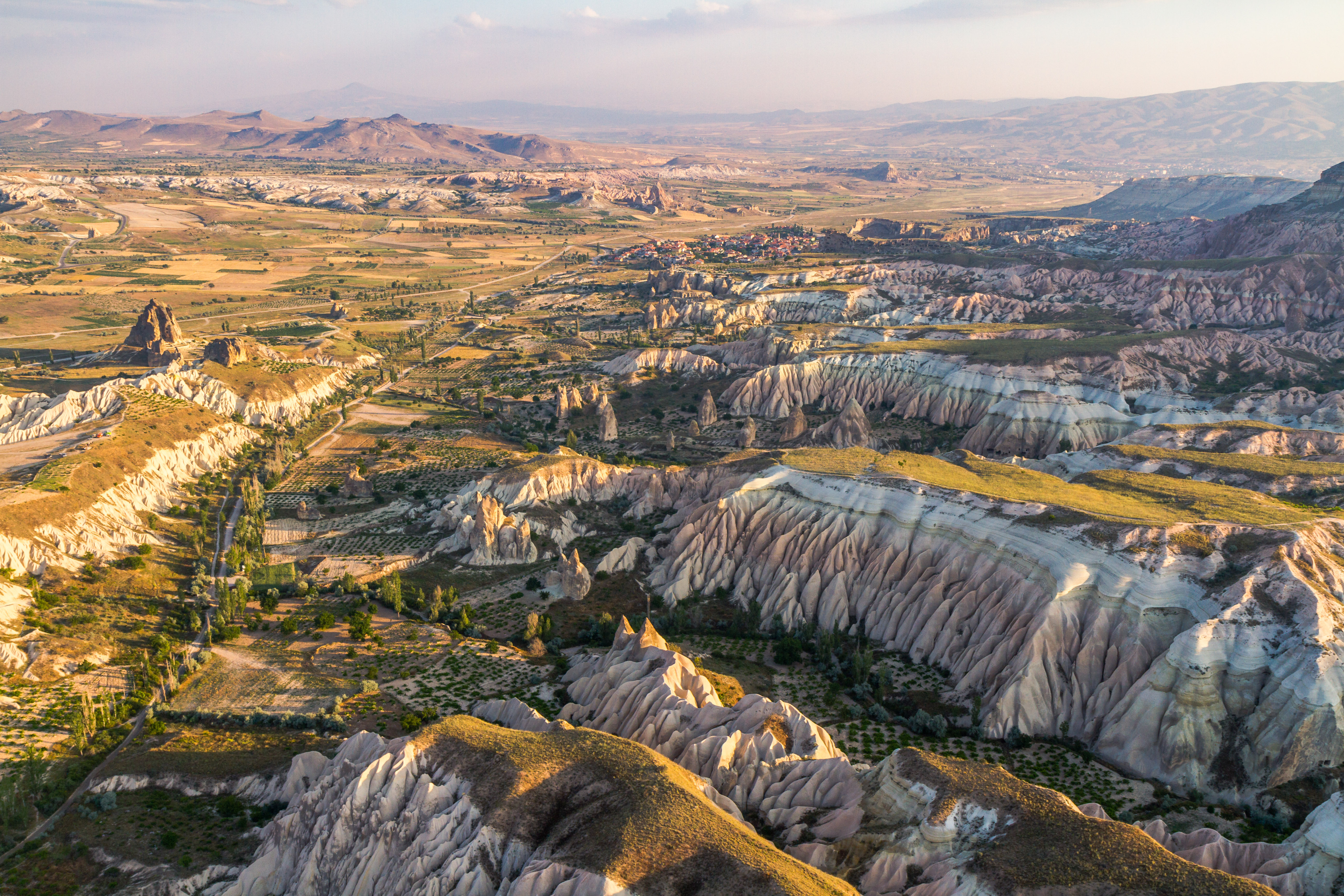
- Cappadocia Landscape

- Location of the province within Turkey
- Coordinates: 38°46′54″N 34°41′17″E
- Country: Turkey
- Seat: Nevşehir

Government
  - Governor: Hüseyin Kök
- Area: 5,485 km^{2} (2,118 sq mi)
- Population (2024): 317,952
  - Density: 57.97/km^{2} (150.1/sq mi)
- Time zone: UTC+3 (TRT)
- Area code: 0384
- Website: www.nevsehir.gov.tr

Nevşehir Province (Turkish: Nevşehir ili) is a province in central Turkey with its capital in Nevşehir. Its area is 5,485 km^{2}, and its population is 317,952 (2024). Its adjacent provinces are Kırşehir to the northwest, Aksaray to the southwest, Niğde to the south, Kayseri to the southeast, and Yozgat to the northeast. Nevşehir includes the area called Cappadocia – a tourist attraction in Turkey. The town of Göreme is also located in Nevşehir. Nevşehir was declared a World Peace City by the United Nations.

Cappadocia once included the area now covered by this province. This province is notable for the fairy chimneys of Göreme, the Ortahisar (middle fortress), and a number of old churches from the Byzantine period.

== History ==
=== Archaeology ===
An approximately 5,000-year-old three-story underground town which referred as "Gir-Gör" (Enter and See) by locals was revealed in Avanos in 2019. The five-kilometer-long city consisted of three floors, homes, tunnels, places of worship and a small human figurine. According to the locals, the site was considered a source of "healing water" and "Caesar's bath."

Nevşehir Province contains numerous underground settlements, including Derinkuyu and Kaymaklı, which are among the largest underground cities in Cappadocia and are considered major archaeological and tourist sites.

== Sports ==
A multiday track running ultramarathon of desert concept, called Runfire Cappadocia Ultramarathon, is held since 2012 annually in July. The race tours 244 km (152 mi) in six days through several historic places across Cappadocia reaching out to Lake Tuz.

== Districts ==
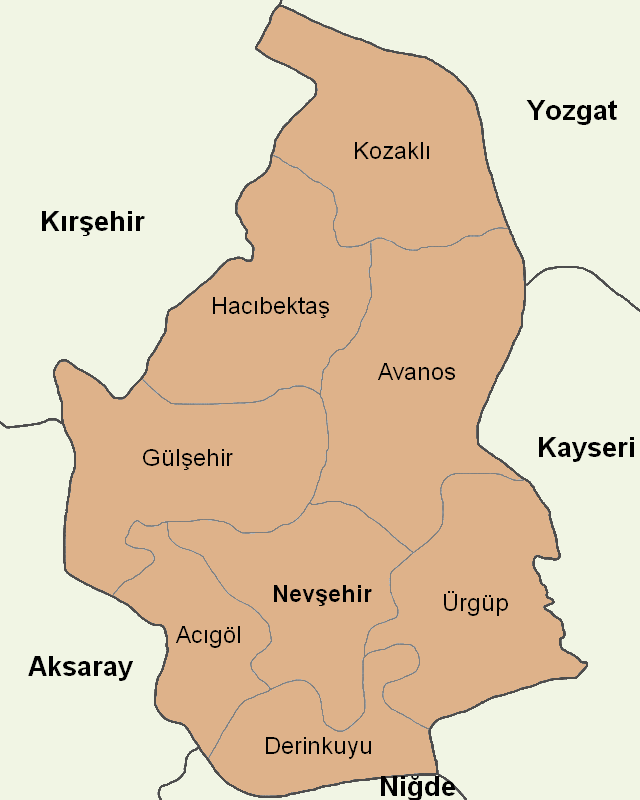

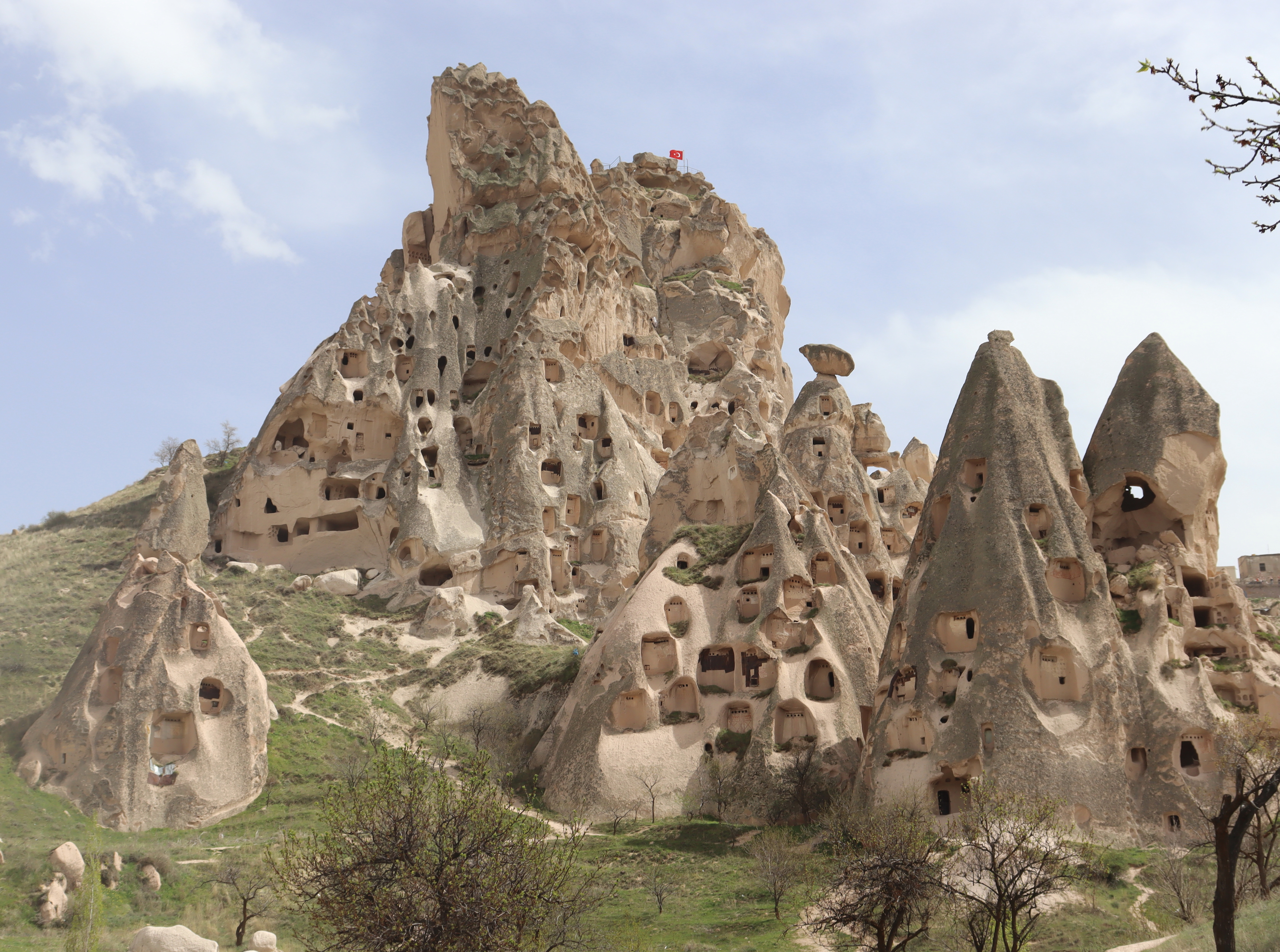
A view from Cappadocia.

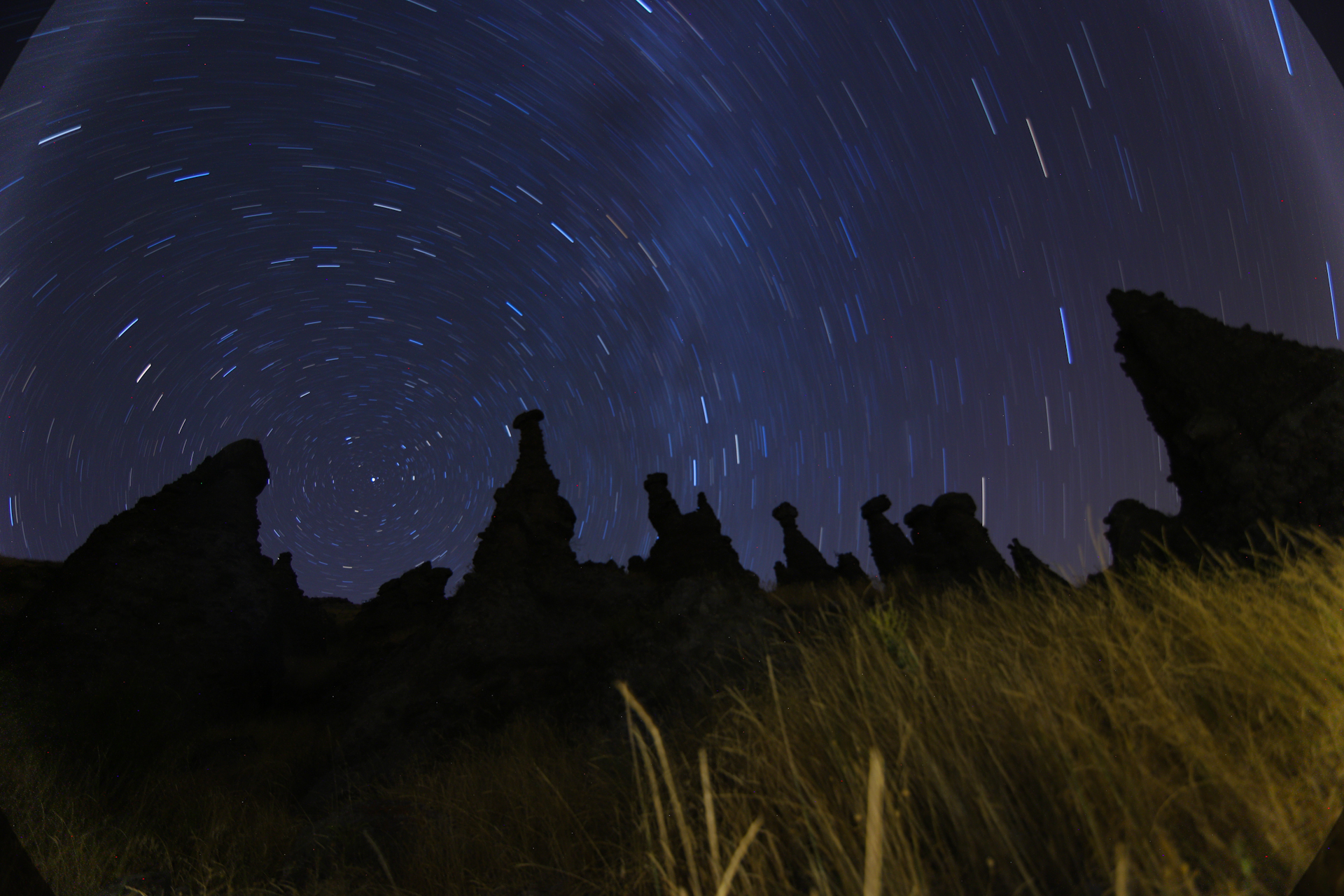
A view timelapse from Cappadocia.

Nevşehir province is divided into 8 districts (capital district in bold):

- Acıgöl
- Avanos
- Derinkuyu
- Gülşehir
- Hacıbektaş
- Kozaklı
- **Nevşehir**
- Ürgüp

== Places of Interest ==
- Göreme Open Air Museum
- Uçhisar Castle
- Göreme Historical National Park
- Uç Güzeller, "The Three Beauties" fairy chimneys in Ürgüp
- Love Valley
- Zelve Open Air Museum
- Red and Rose Valley
- Ortahisar Castle
- Mustafapaşa
- Meryem Ana Kilisesi, Mother Mary Church near Nevşehir Castle
- the Hagios Georgios Church, also known as the 'Çanlı Church' near Nevşehir Castle
- Avanos, known for its clay pottery.
- St. John the Baptist Chapel
- Aynalı (Fırkatan) Church
- Açık Saray Museum
- Derinkuyu Underground City
- Kaymakli Underground City
- Tatlarin Underground City
- Haji Bektash Veli Complex

== Gallery ==
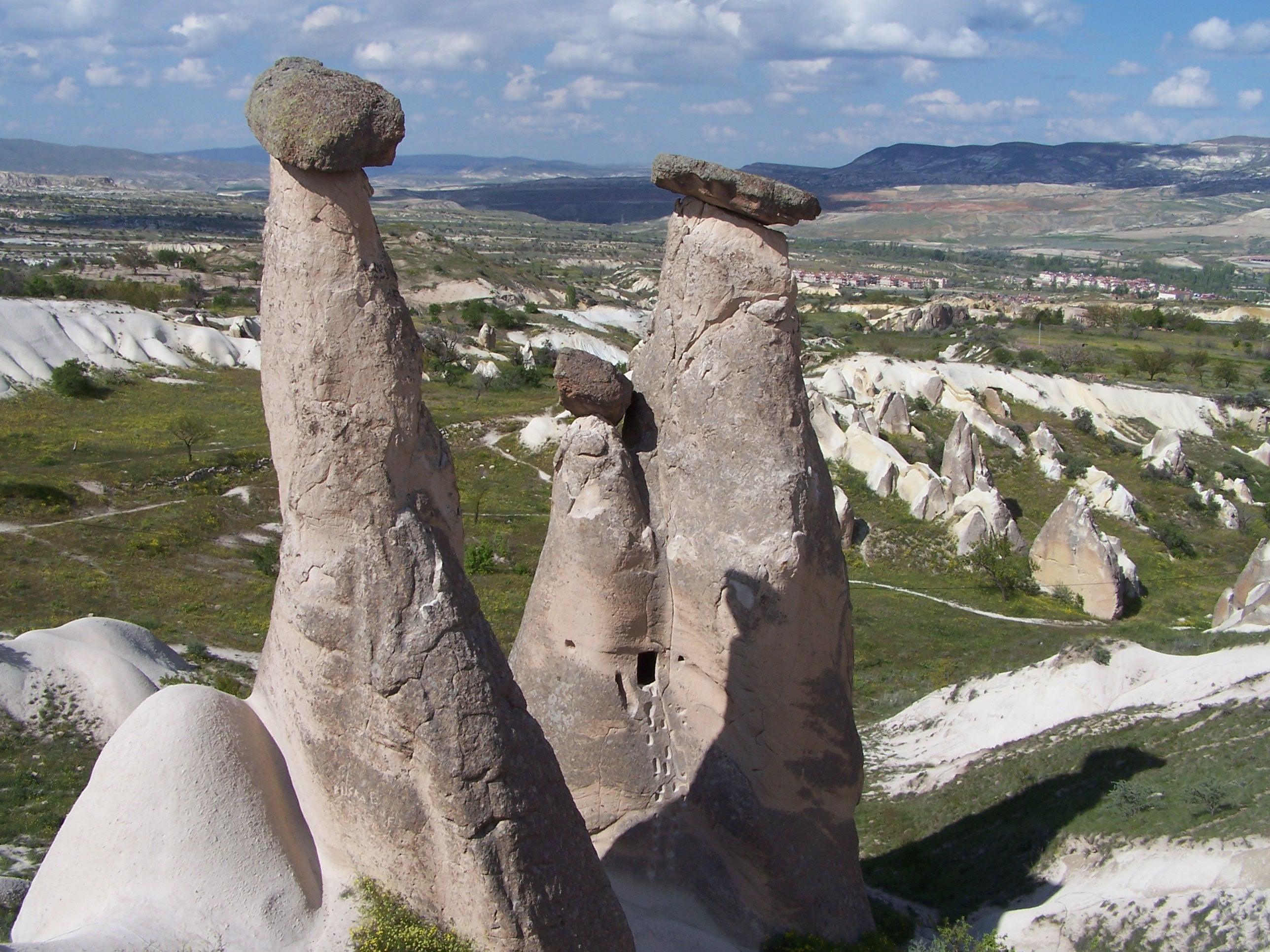
Fairy chimneys in Ürgüp

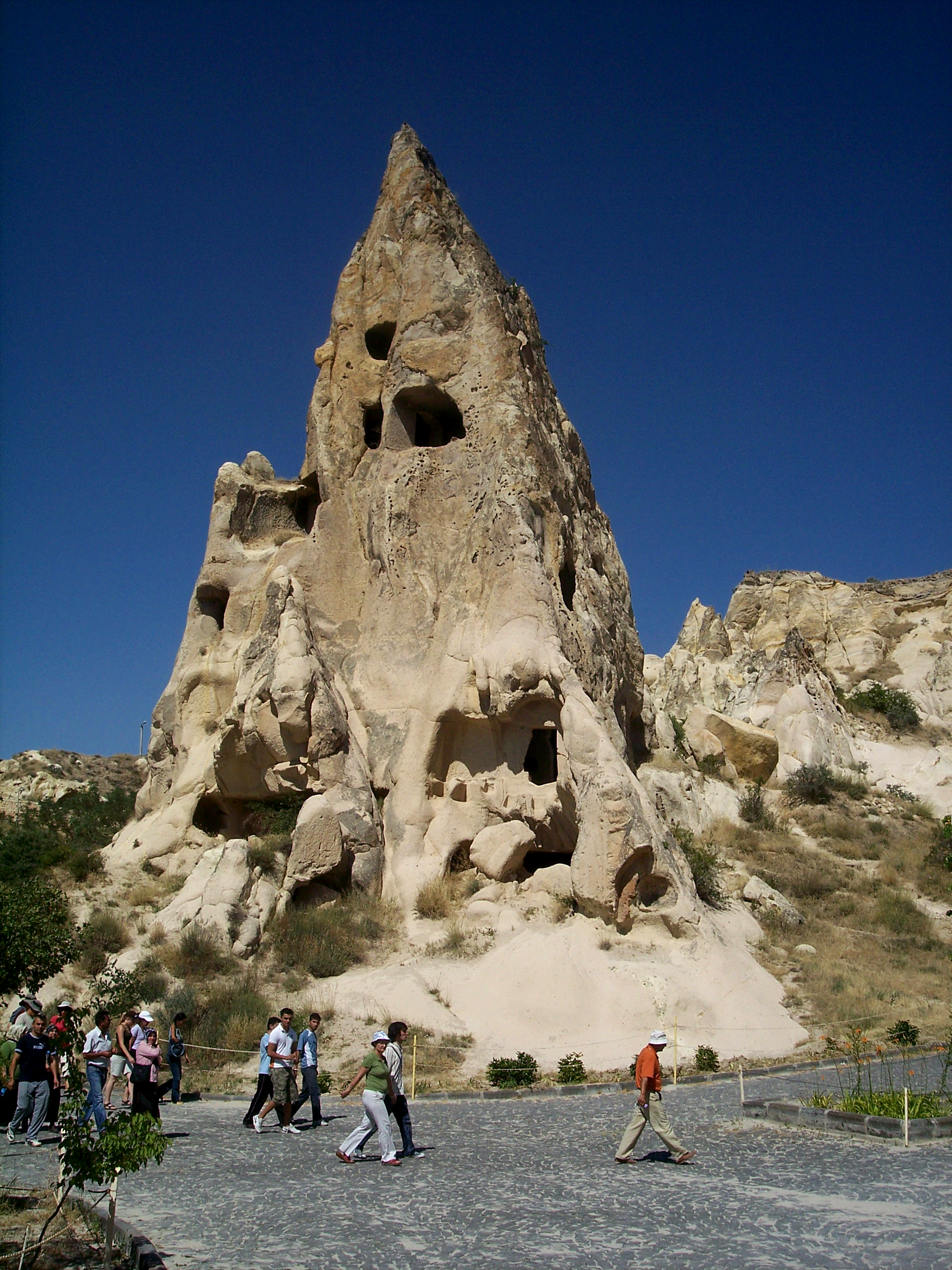
Rock formation in Goreme Open Air Museum

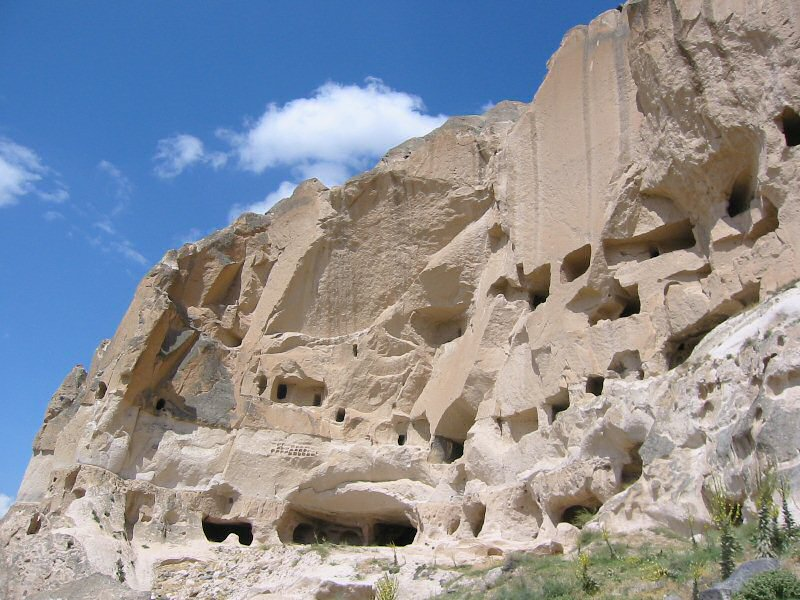
A view from Tatlarin, Nevşehir

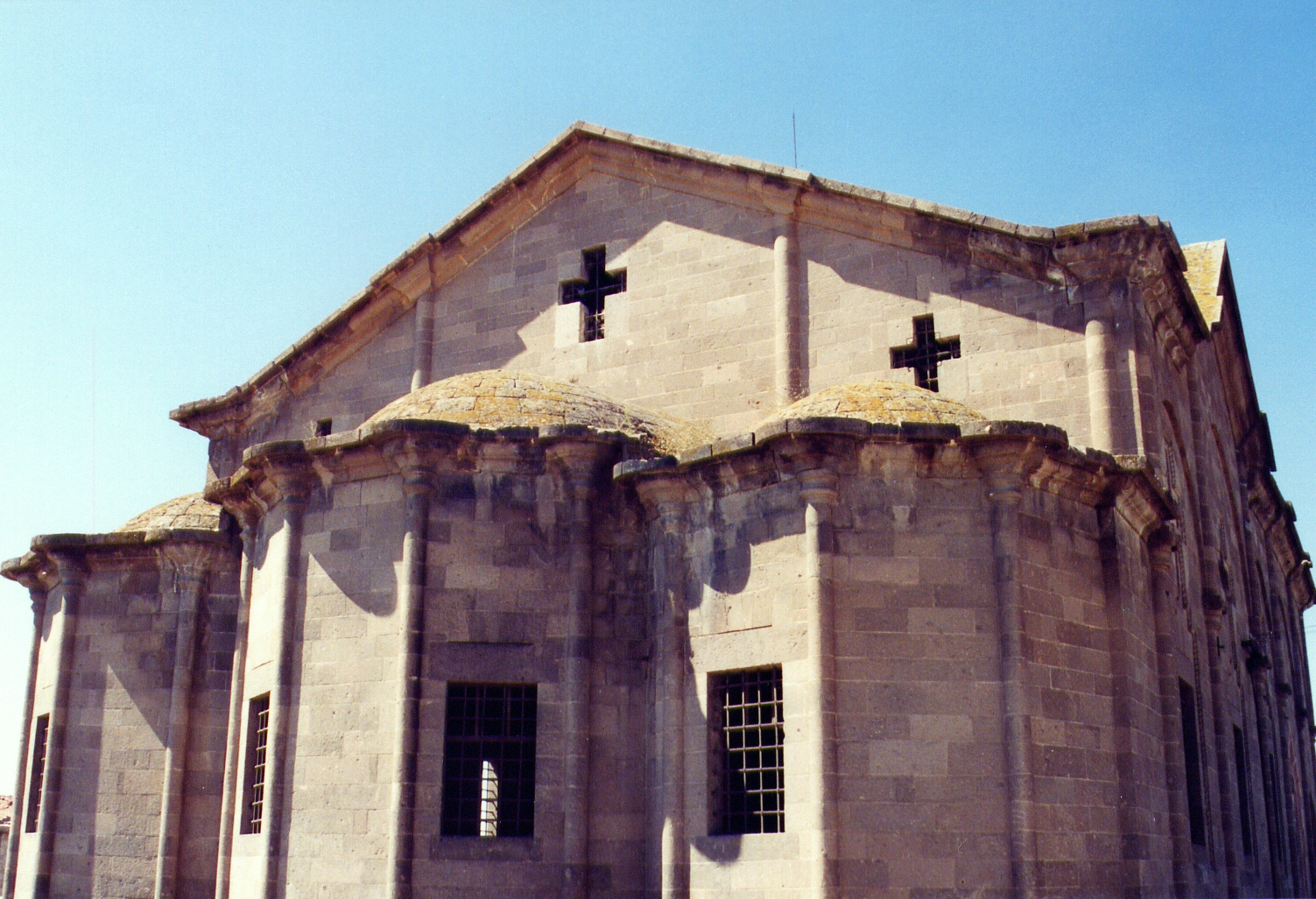
A historical church in Derinkuyu

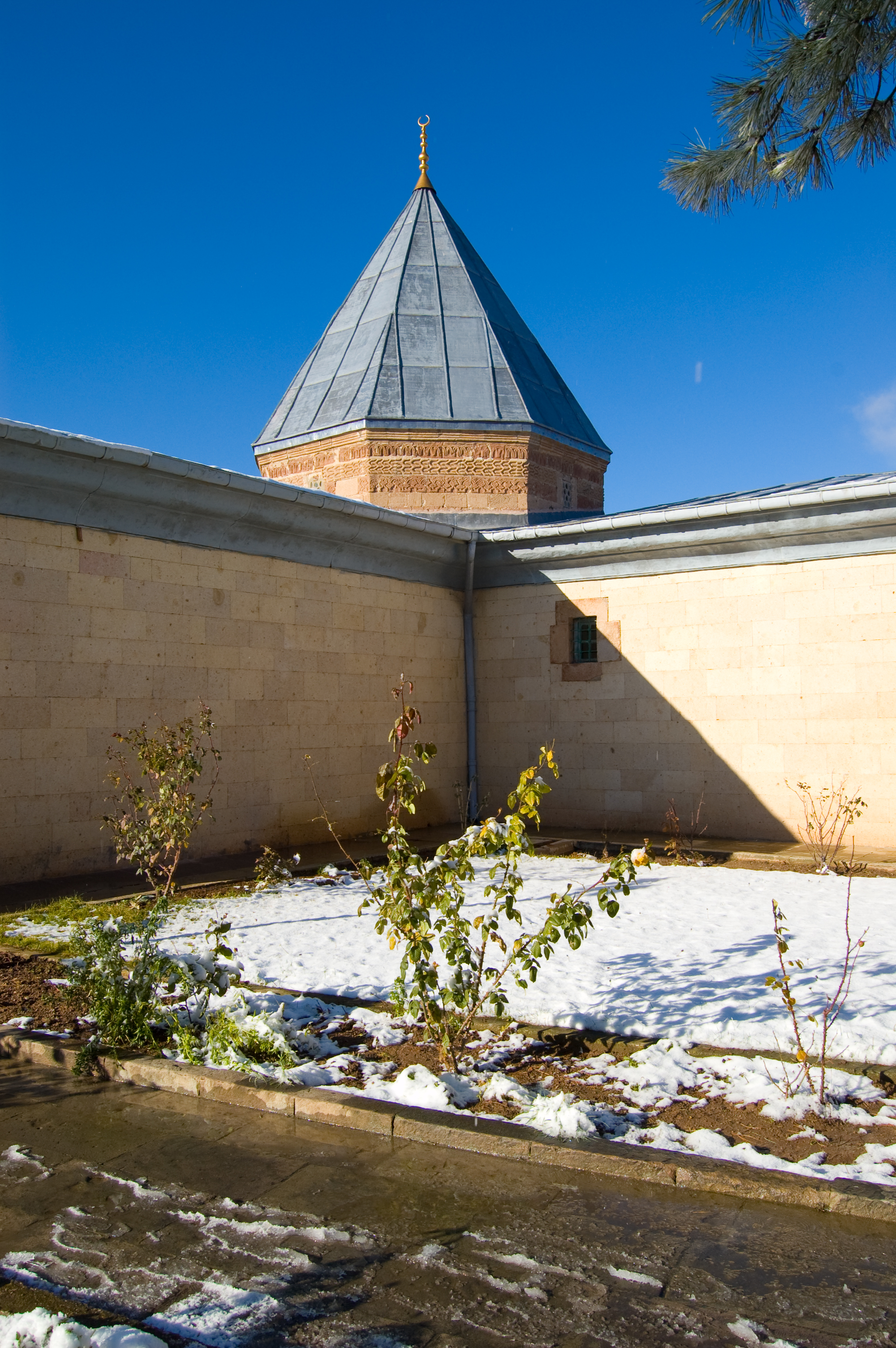
Hajibektash complex in Hacibektas

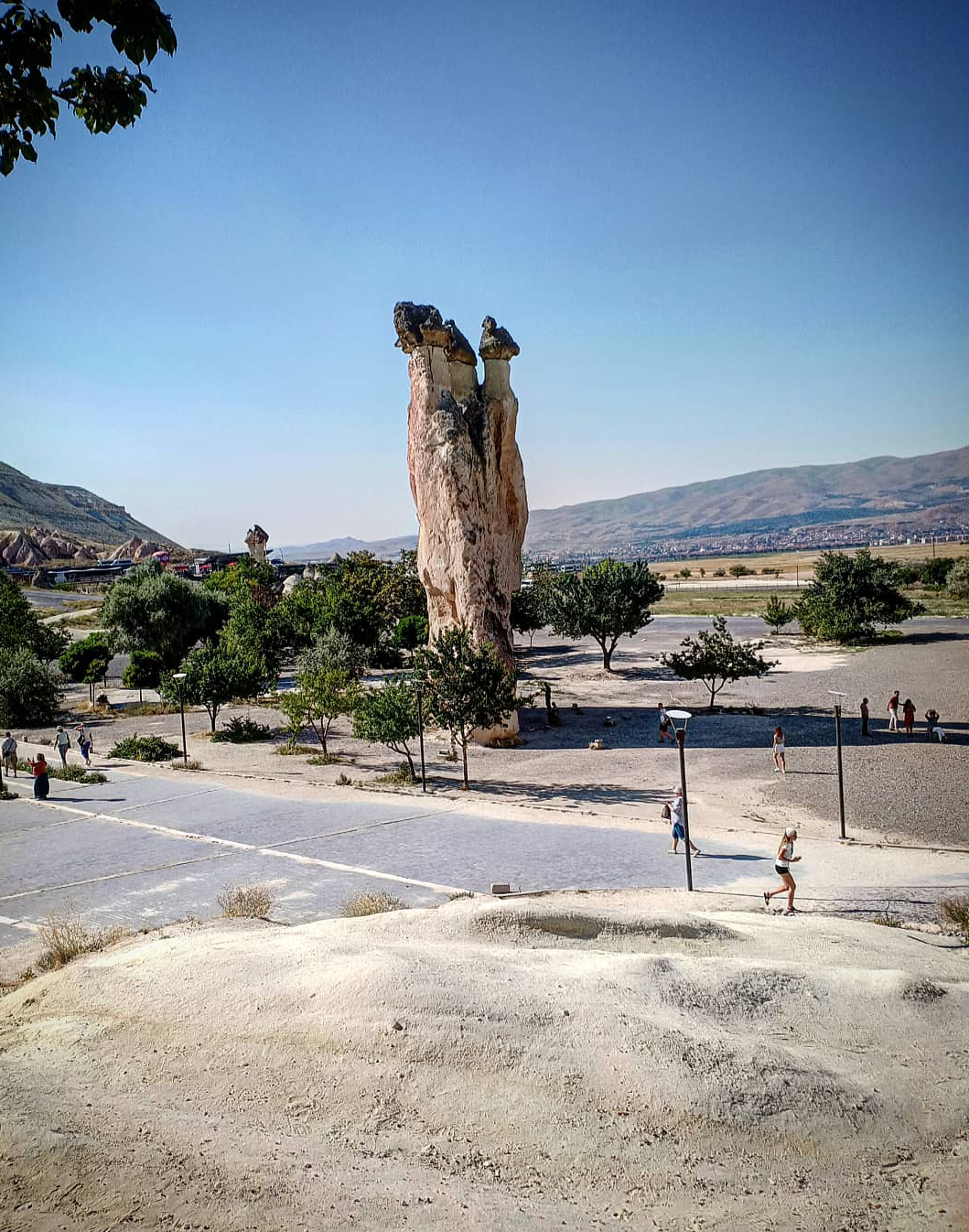

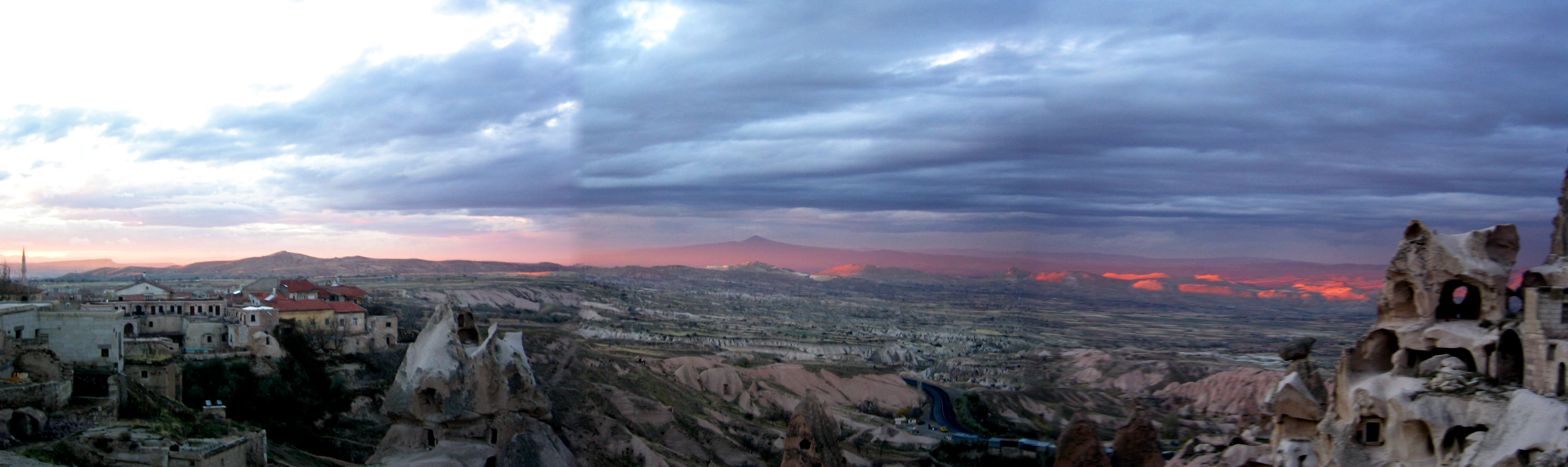
Ortahisar overlook.

Gülşehir church of St. John

== See also ==
- List of municipalities in Nevşehir Province
- Nevşehir Kapadokya Airport
