= Cappadocia =

Historical region in Central Anatolia, Turkey

- Ancient region of Anatolia
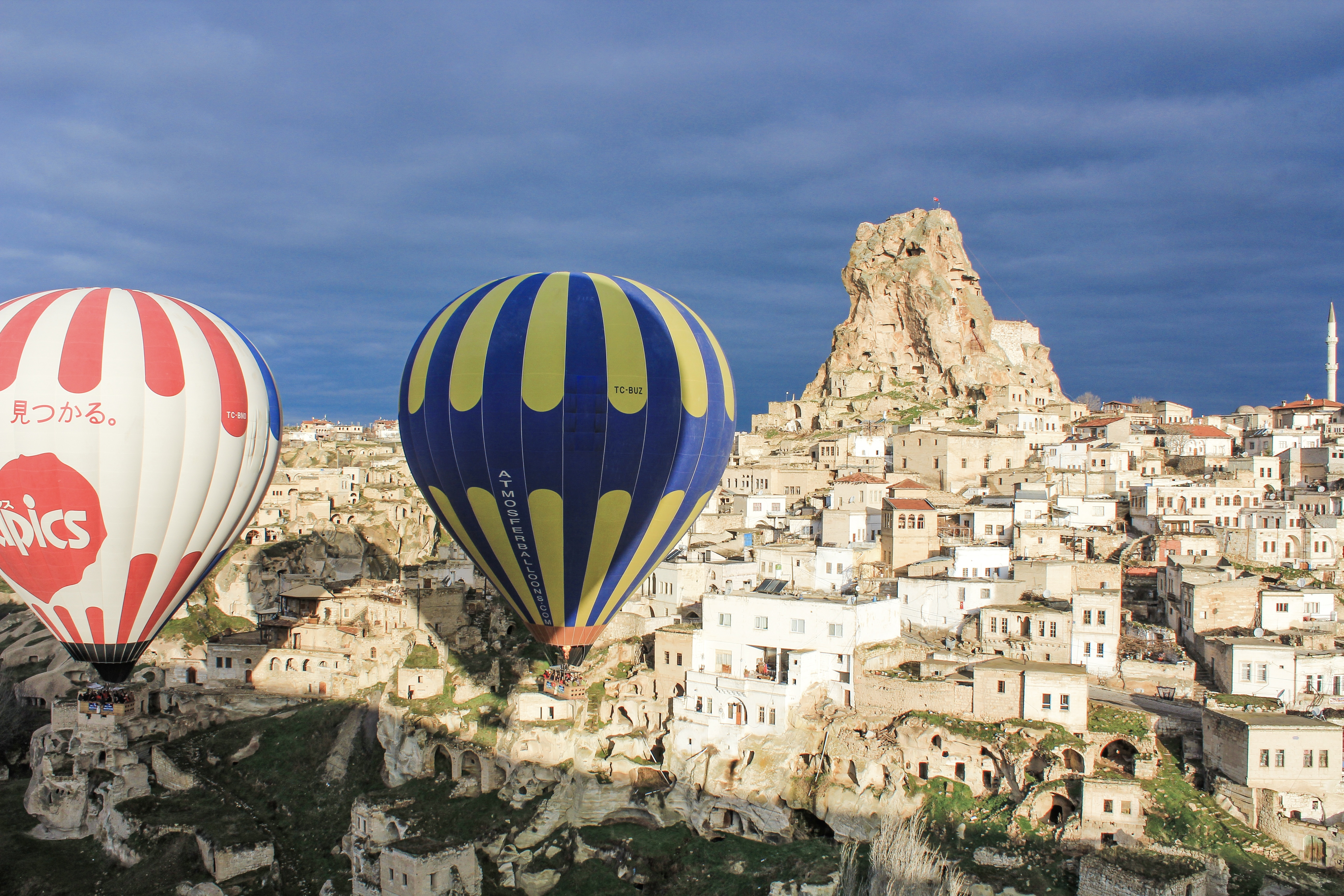
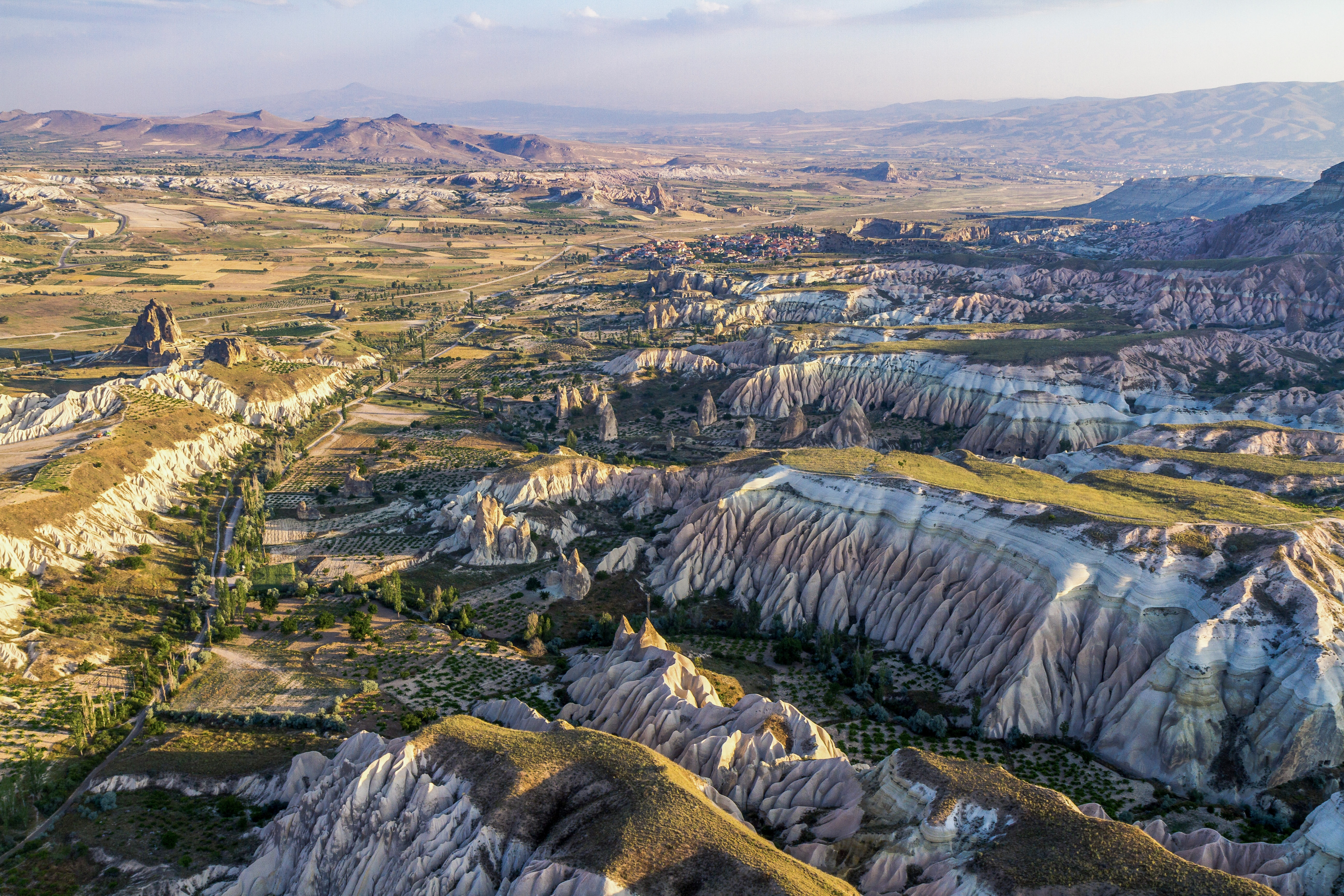
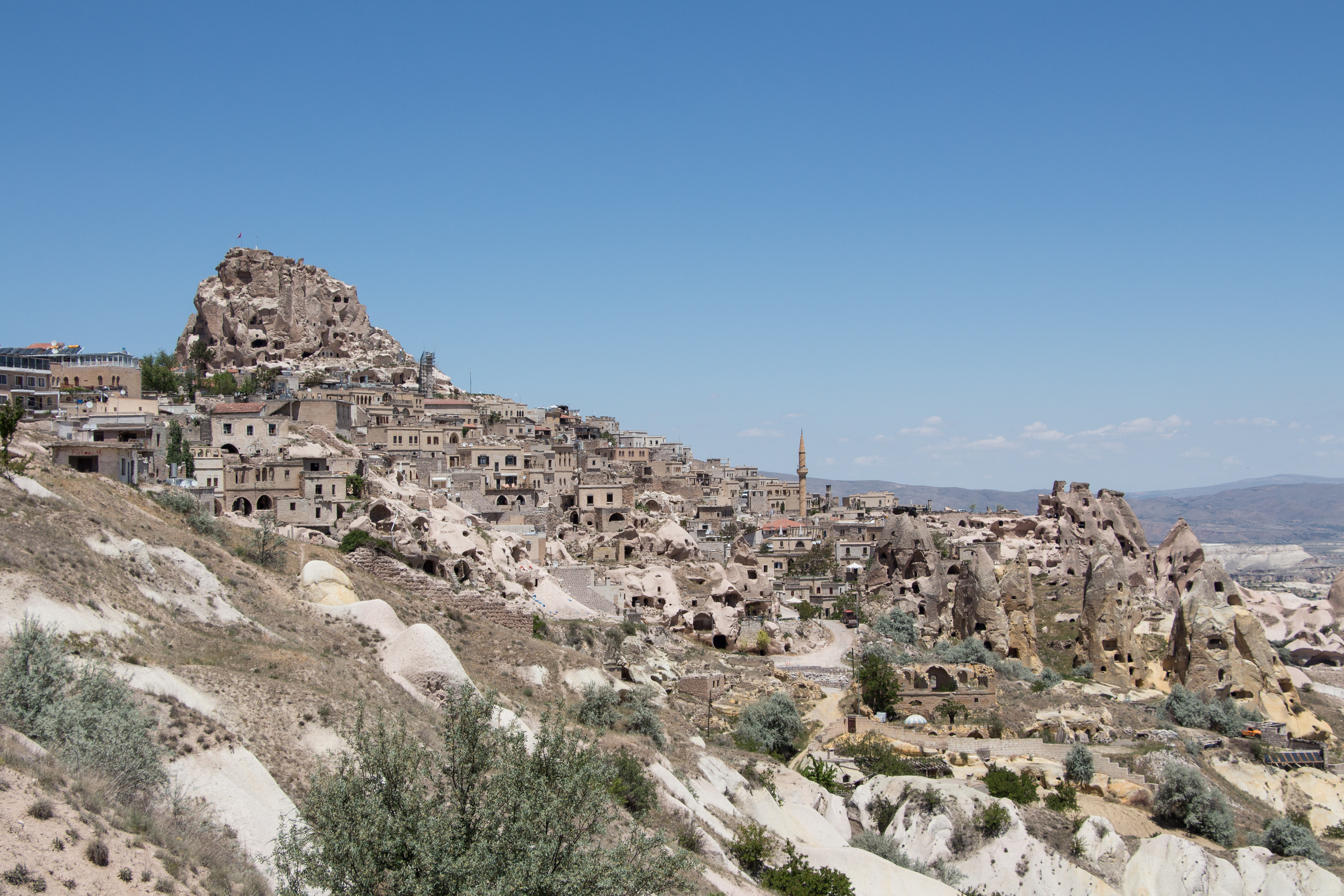
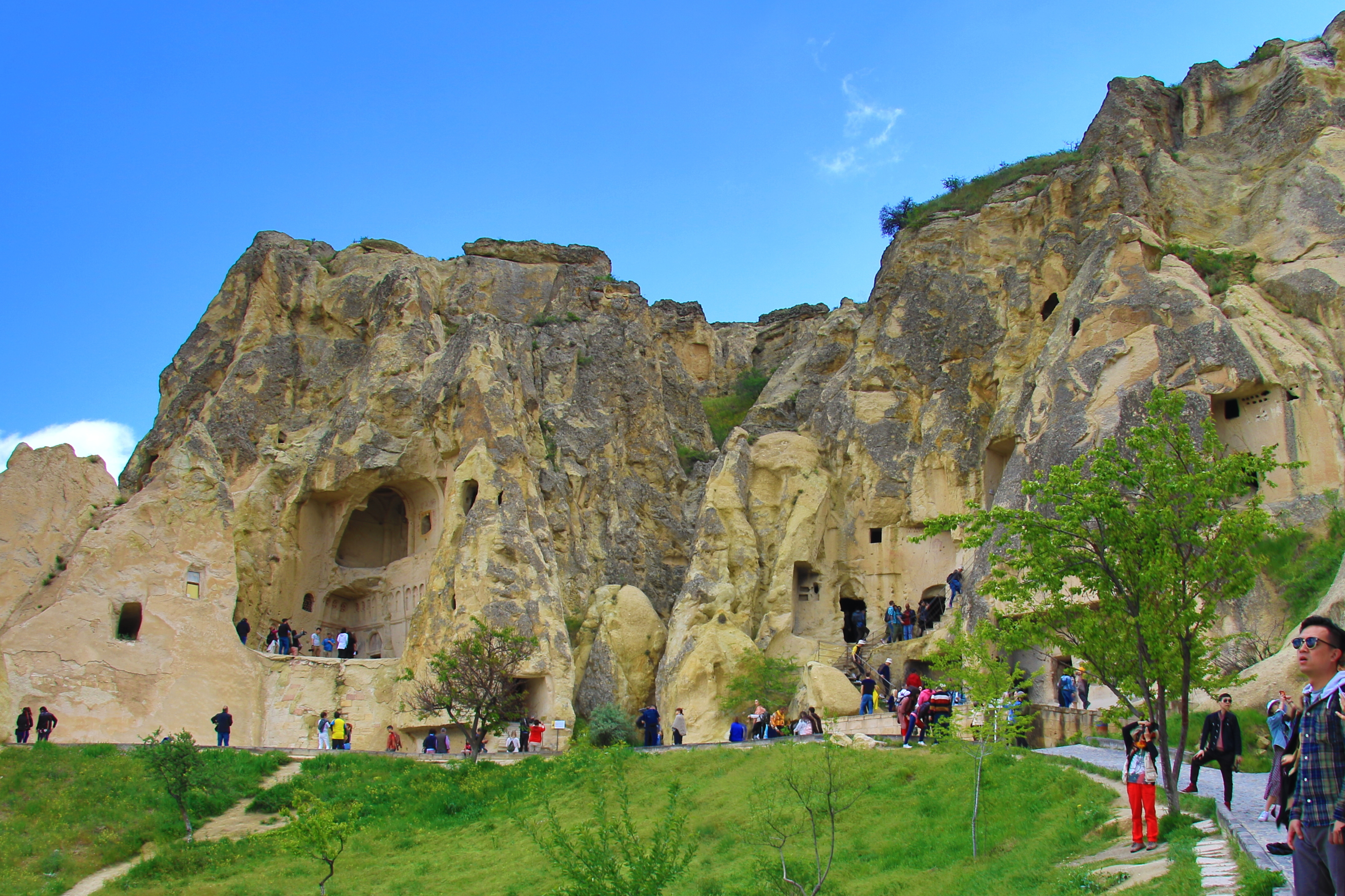
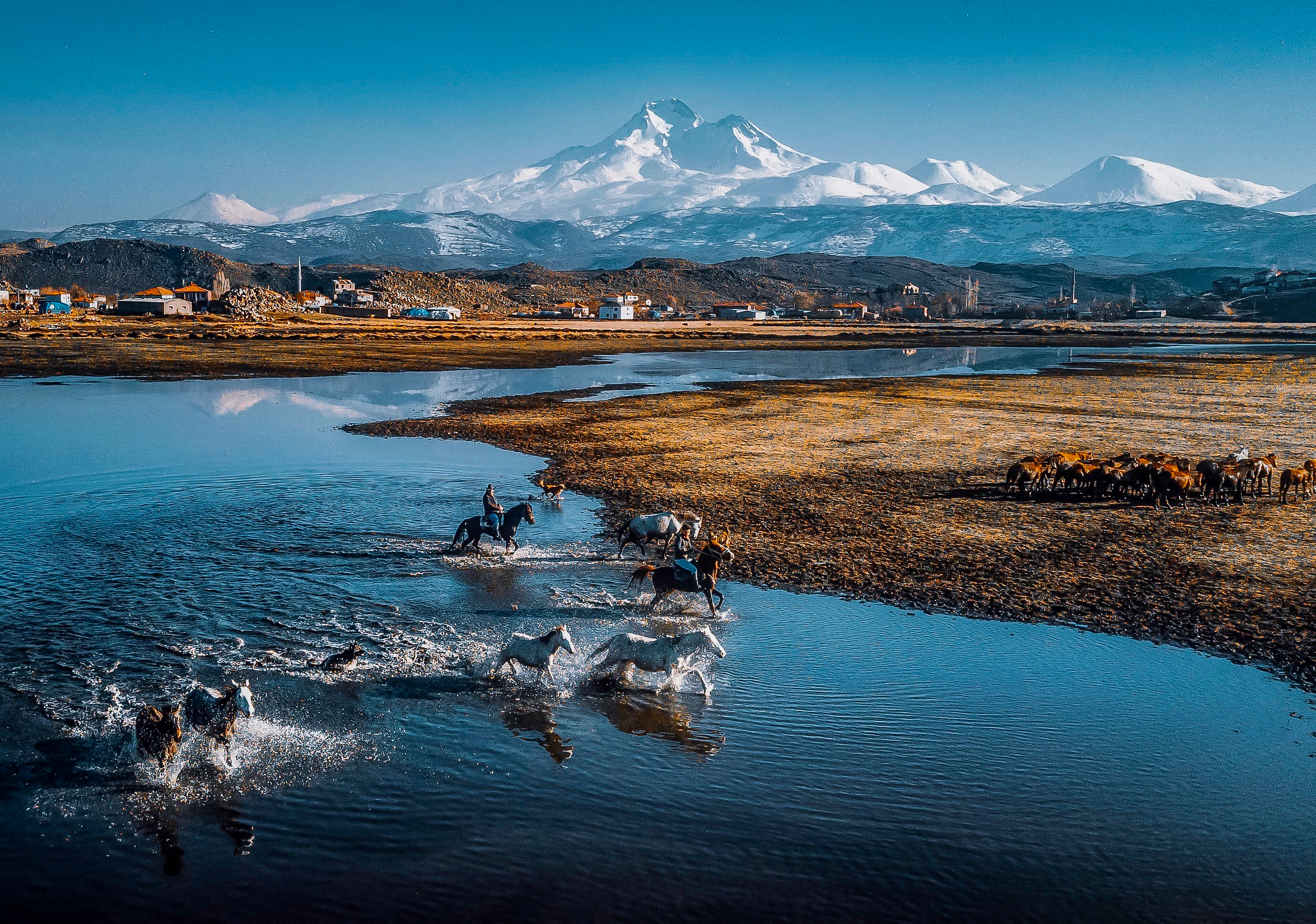
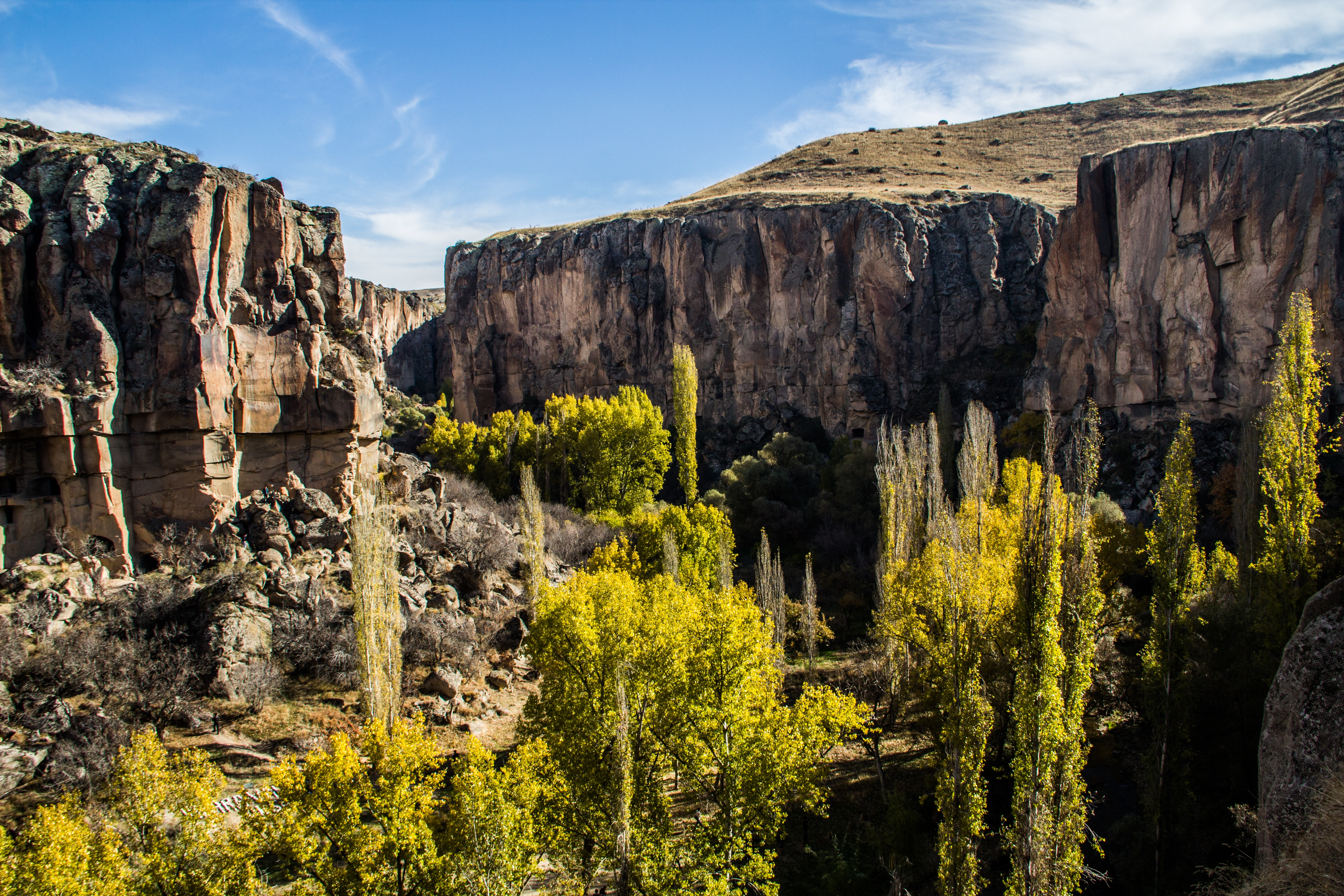
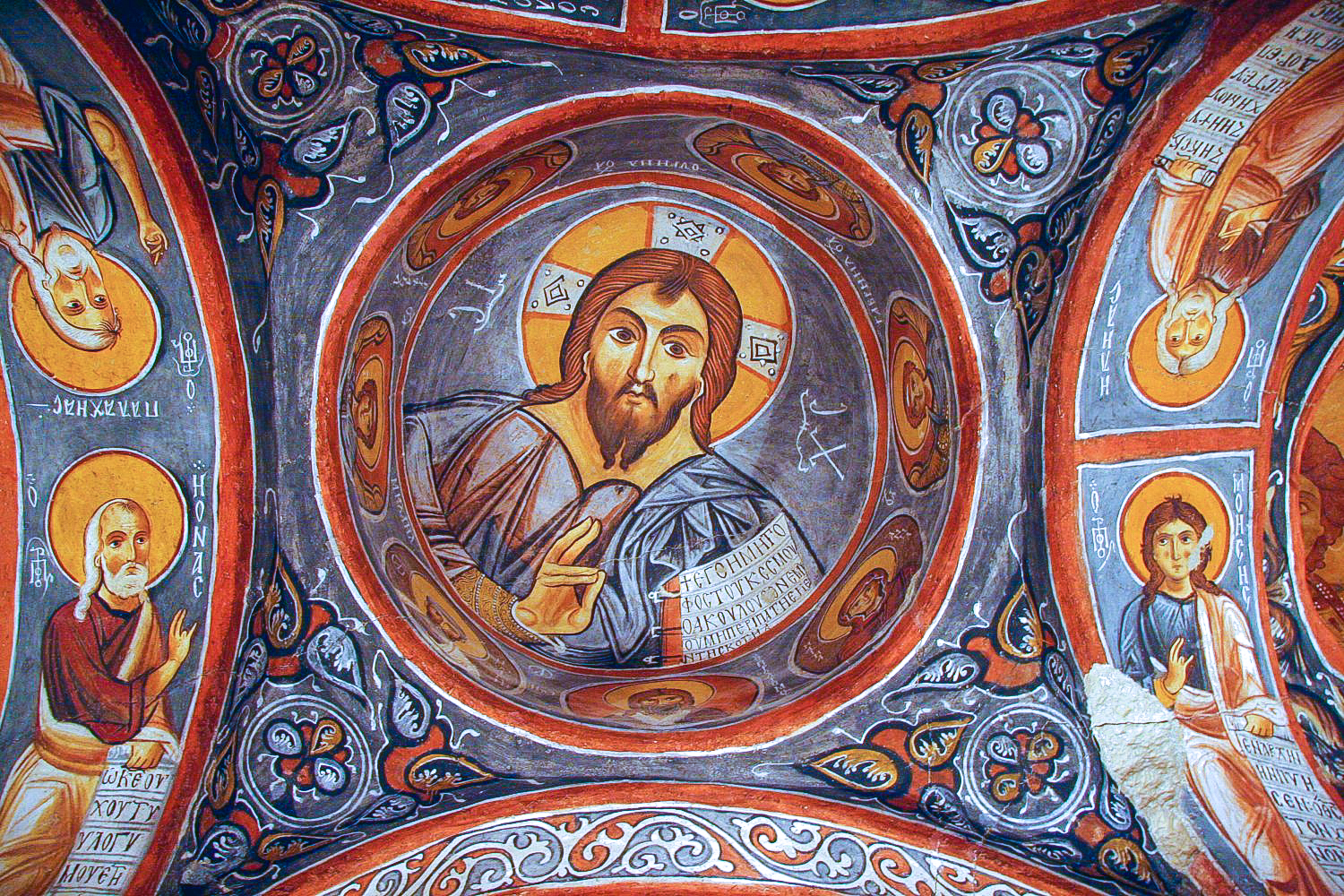
- Clockwise from top: Ortahisar Castle, Aerial view over Cappadocia, View of Uçhisar Castle, Göreme Open Air Museum, Mount Erciyes, Ihlara Valley and Churches of Göreme

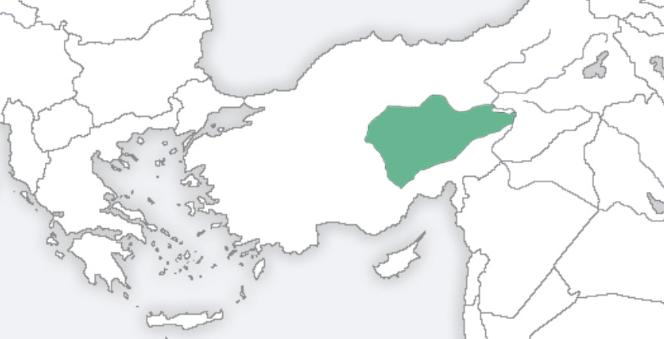
- Location of Cappadocia
- Persian satrapy: Katpatuka
- Roman province: Cappadocia

Göreme National Park and the Rock Sites of Cappadocia
UNESCO World Heritage Site
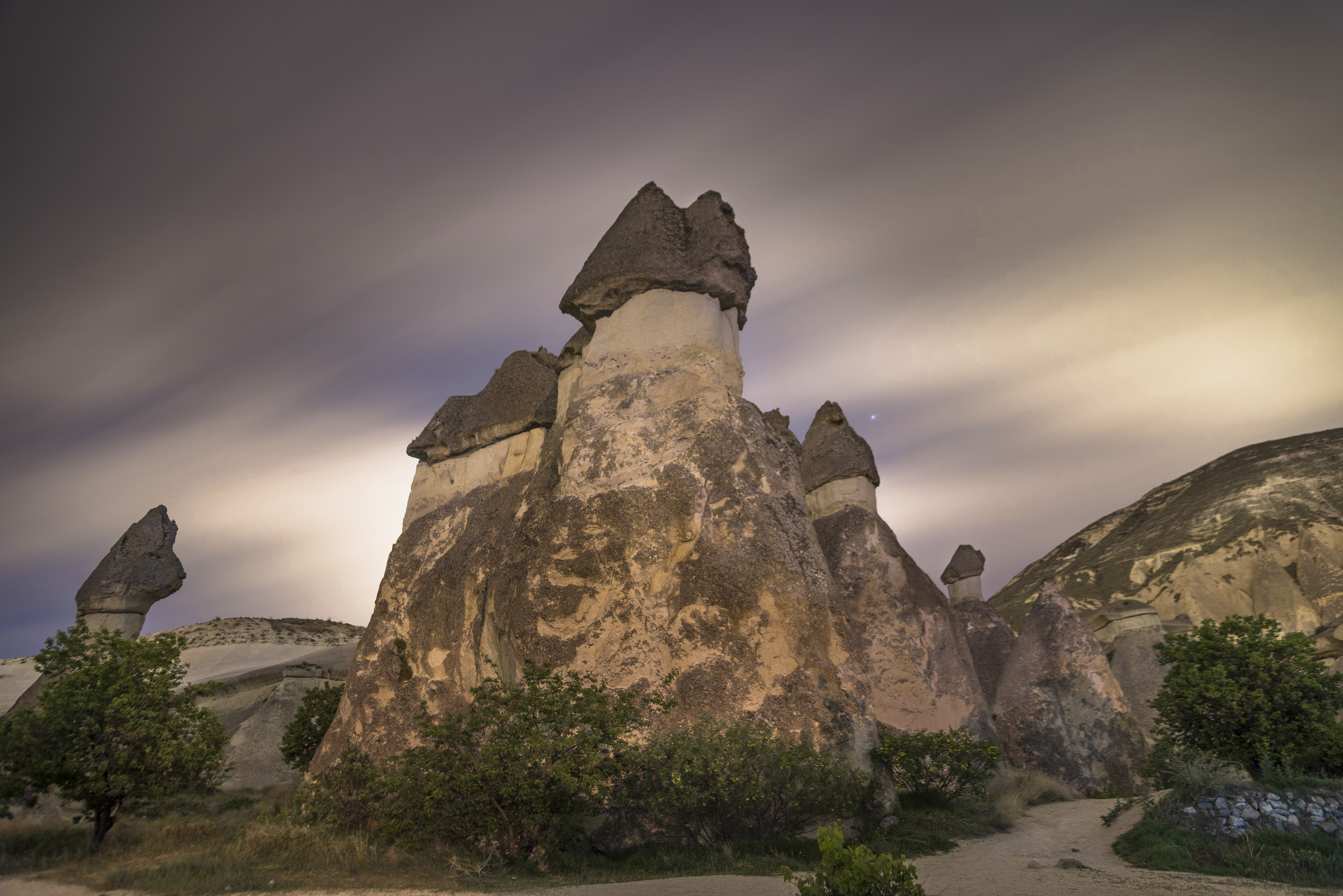
- Interactive map of Göreme National Park and the Rock Sites of Cappadocia
- Includes: Göreme National Park, Kaymakli Underground City, Derinkuyu underground city
- Criteria: Cultural: i, iii, v; Natural: vii
- Reference: 357
- Inscription: 1985 (9th Session)
- Area: 9,883.81 ha (24,423.4 acres)

Cappadocia (/kæpəˈdoʊʃəˌ -ˈdoʊkiə/; Turkish: Kapadokya) is a historical region in Central Anatolia region, Turkey. It is largely in the provinces of Nevşehir, Kayseri, Aksaray, Kırşehir, Sivas and Niğde. Today, the touristic Cappadocia Region is located in Nevşehir province.

According to Herodotus, in the time of the Ionian Revolt (499 BC), the Cappadocians were reported as occupying a region from the Taurus Mountains to the vicinity of the Euxine (Black Sea). Cappadocia, in this sense, was bounded in the south by the chain of mountains that separate it from Cilicia, to the east by the upper Euphrates, to the north by the Pontus, and to the west by Lycaonia and eastern Galatia.

The name, traditionally used in Christian sources throughout history, continues in use as an international tourism concept to define a region of exceptional natural wonders, in particular characterized by fairy chimneys, in addition to its religious heritage of being a centre of early Christian learning, evidenced by hundreds of churches and monasteries (such as those of Göreme and Ihlara), as well as underground cities that were dug to offer protection during periods of persecution.

== Etymology ==
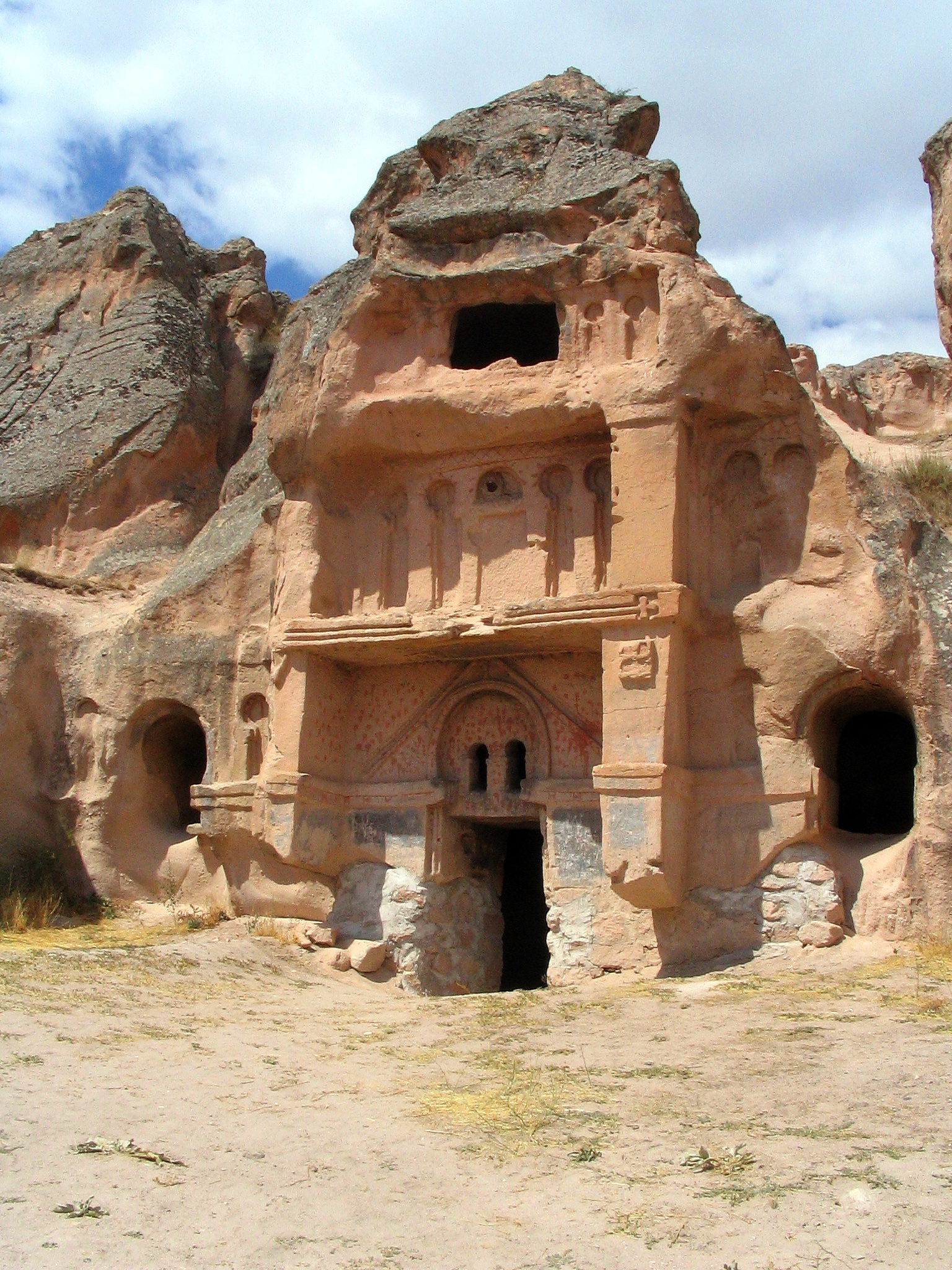
The facade of an ancient church called Açık Saray, literally meaning "Open Palace", carved into the valley walls in Gülşehir, Cappadocia

The earliest record of the name of Cappadocia (/kæpəˈdoʊʃəˌ -ˈdoʊkiə/; Turkish: Kapadokya; Ancient Greek: Καππαδοκία, romanized: Kappadokía, Classical Syriac: ܩܦܘܕܩܝܐ, romanized: Kəp̄uḏoqyā, from Old Persian: 𐎣𐎫𐎱𐎬𐎢𐎣 Katpatuka; Hittite: 𒅗𒋫𒁉𒁕, romanized: Katapeda; Armenian: Կապադովկիա,, romanized: Kapadovkia) dates from the late sixth century BC, when it appears in the trilingual inscriptions of two early Achaemenid emperors, Darius the Great and Xerxes I, as one of the countries (Old Persian dahyu-). In these lists of countries, the Old Persian name is Katpatuka. It was proposed that Kat-patuka came from the Luwian language, meaning "Low Country".

Subsequent research suggests that the adverb katta meaning 'down, below' is exclusively Hittite, while its Luwian equivalent is zanta. Therefore, the recent modification of this proposal operates with the Hittite katta peda-, literally "place below" as a starting point for the development of the toponym Cappadocia.

The earlier derivation from Iranian Hu-apa-dahyu 'Land of good horses' can hardly be reconciled with the phonetic shape of Kat-patuka. Several other etymologies have also been offered in the past.

Herodotus wrote that the name of the Cappadocians was applied to them by the Persians, while they were termed by the Greeks "White Syrians" (Leucosyri), who were most probably descendants of the Hittites. One of the Cappadocian tribes he mentions is the Moschoi, associated by Flavius Josephus with the biblical figure Meshech, son of Japheth: "and the Mosocheni were founded by Mosoch; now they are Cappadocians". AotJ I:6.

Under the later kings of the Persian Empire, the Cappadocians were divided into two satrapies, or governments, with one comprising the central and inland portion, to which the name of Cappadocia continued to be applied by Greek geographers, while the other was called Pontus. This division had already come about before the time of Xenophon. After the fall of the Persian government, the two provinces continued to be separate, the distinction was perpetuated, and the name Cappadocia came to be restricted to the inland province (sometimes called Great Cappadocia), which alone will be the focus of this article.

The kingdom of Cappadocia still existed in the time of Strabo (c. 64 BC – c. AD 24) as a nominally independent state. Cilicia was the name given to the district in which Caesarea, the capital of the whole country, was situated. The only two cities of Cappadocia considered by Strabo to deserve that appellation were Caesarea (originally known as Mazaca) and Tyana, not far from the foot of the Taurus.

== Geography and climate ==
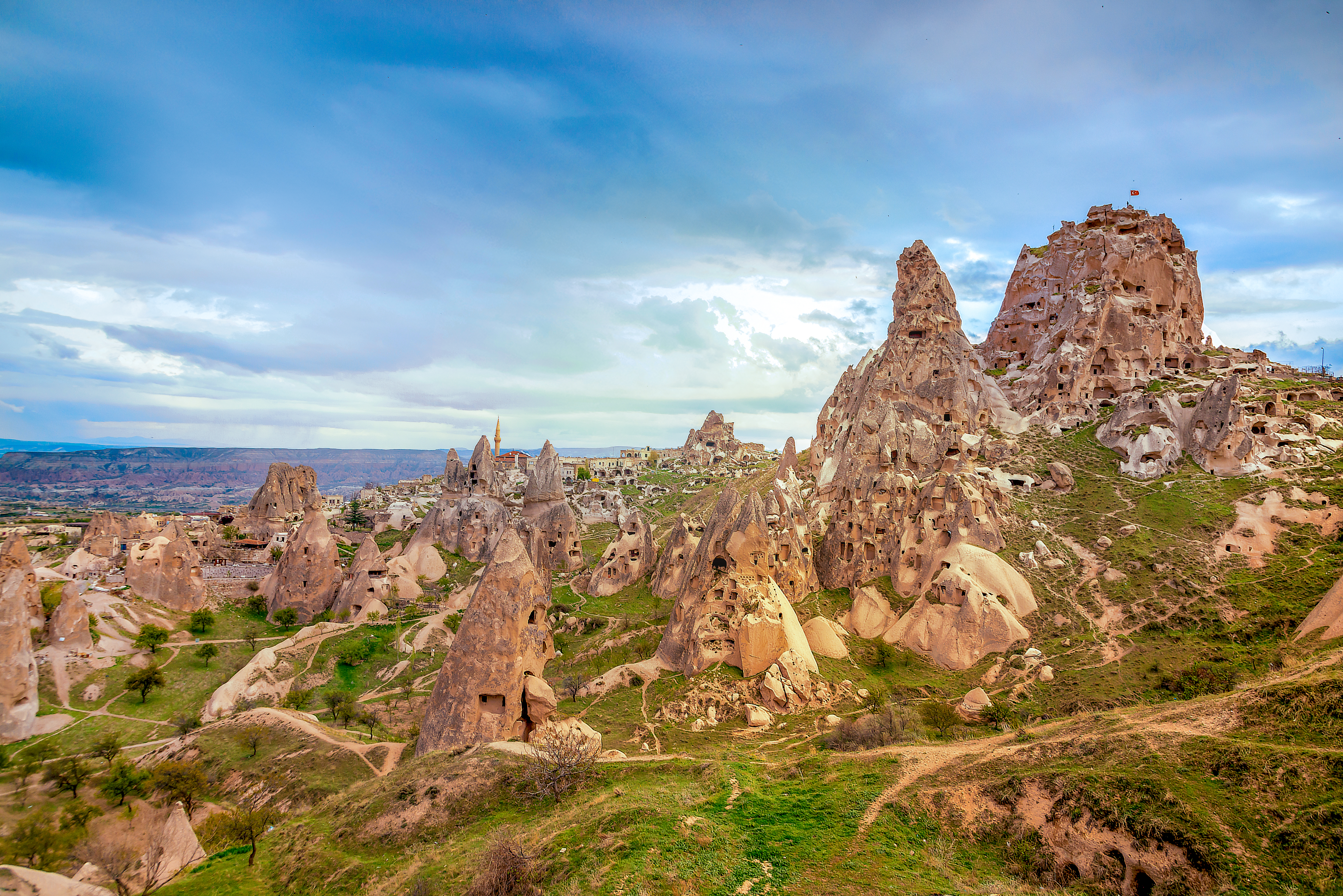
Fairy chimneys in Uçhisar, Cappadocia

Cappadocia lies in central Anatolia, in the heartland of what is now Turkey. The relief consists of a high plateau over 1,000 m in altitude that is pierced by volcanic peaks, with Mount Erciyes (ancient Argaeus) near Kayseri (ancient Caesarea) being the tallest at 3,916 m. The boundaries of historical Cappadocia are vague, particularly towards the west.

To the south, the Taurus Mountains form the boundary with Cilicia and separate Cappadocia from the Mediterranean Sea. To the west, Cappadocia is bounded by the historical regions of Lycaonia to the southwest, and Galatia to the northwest. Due to its inland location and high altitude, Cappadocia has a markedly continental climate, with hot, dry summers and cold, snowy winters. Rainfall is sparse and the region is largely semi-arid.

Cappadocia contained the source of the Sarus and Pyramus rivers, and the middle course of the Halys river, and the tributary of the Euphrates, later called Tokhma Su. As none of these rivers was navigable or served to fertilize the lands along its course, none has much importance in the history of the province.

== Geology ==
Ignimbrites of Miocene age are present within the area. The distinctive landscape of Cappadocia was formed through the erosion of thick volcanic deposits created by ancient eruptions of Mount Erciyes, Mount Hasan, and Göllüdağ. Over millions of years, wind and water erosion shaped these soft volcanic rocks into the region's characteristic fairy chimneys and rock formations. Prominent rock formations such as Ortahisar and Uçhisar are composed of harder volcanic rock layers, which were more resistant to erosion than the surrounding softer deposits. As a result, these formations remained elevated over time and were later adapted for the construction of rock-cut castles and settlements.

In respect of the 'voluminous eruption deposits in a fluvio-lacustrine sequence with 'fairy-chimney' development produced by uplift and erosion', the International Union of Geological Sciences (IUGS) included 'The Miocene Cappadocian ignimbrites sequence' in its assemblage of 100 'geological heritage sites' around the world in a listing published in October 2022. The organisation defines an IUGS Geological Heritage Site as 'a key place with geological elements and/or processes of international scientific relevance, used as a reference, and/or with a substantial contribution to the development of geological sciences through history.'

== History ==
=== Ancient history ===
Achaemenid Cappadocia

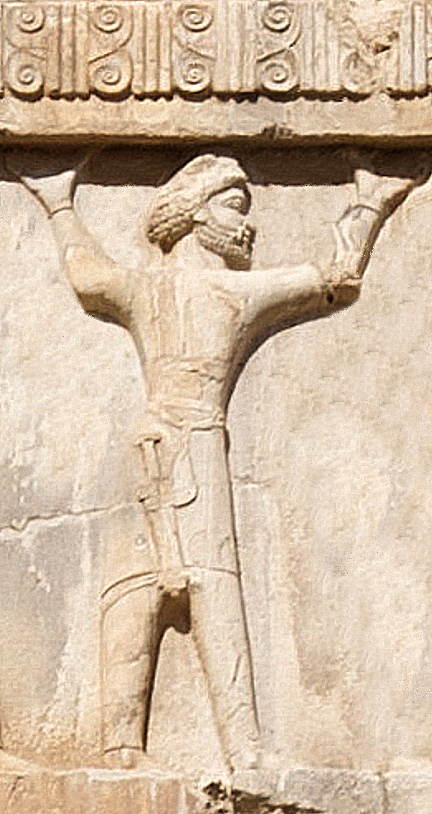
A Cappadocian soldier of the Achaemenid army, c. 470 BC. Xerxes I tomb relief.

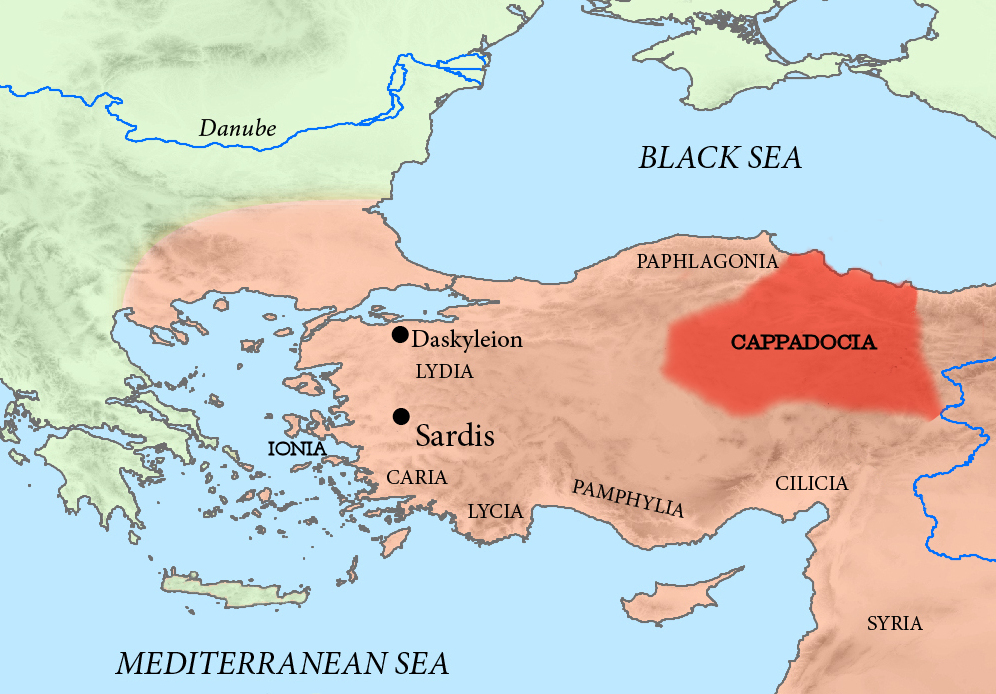
Achaemenid Cappadocia

Cappadocia was known as Hatti in the late Bronze Age, and was the homeland of the Hittite power centred at Hattusa. After the fall of the Hittite Empire, with the decline of the Syro-Cappadocians (Mushki) after their defeat by the Lydian king Croesus in the 6th century BC, Cappadocia was ruled by a sort of feudal aristocracy, dwelling in strong castles and keeping the peasants in a servile condition, which later made them apt to foreign slavery. It was included in the third Persian satrapy in the division established by Darius but continued to be governed by rulers of its own, none apparently supreme over the whole country and all more or less tributaries of the Great King.

=== Kingdom of Cappadocia ===
After ending the Persian Empire, Alexander the Great tried to rule the area through one of his military commanders. But Ariarathes, previously satrap of the region, declared himself king of the Cappadocians. As Ariarathes I (332–322 BC), he was a successful ruler, and he extended the borders of the Cappadocian Kingdom as far as to the Black Sea. The kingdom of Cappadocia lived in peace until the death of Alexander.

The previous empire was then divided into many parts, and Cappadocia fell to Eumenes. His claims were made good in 322 BC by the regent Perdiccas, who crucified Ariarathes; but in the dissensions which brought about Eumenes's death, Ariarathes II, the adopted son of Ariarathes I, recovered his inheritance and left it to a line of successors, who mostly bore the name of the founder of the dynasty.

Persian colonists in the Cappadocian kingdom, cut off from their co-religionists in Iran proper, continued to practice Zoroastrianism. Strabo, observing them in the first century BC, records (XV.3.15) that these "fire kindlers" possessed many "holy places of the Persian Gods", as well as fire temples. Plutarch records also a Greek presence in Cappadocia during the same time period.

Strabo relates, "noteworthy enclosures; and in their midst there is an altar, on which there is a large quantity of ashes and where the magi keep the fire ever burning." According to Strabo, who wrote during the time of Augustus (r. 27 BC – AD 14), almost three hundred years after the fall of the Achaemenid Persian Empire, there remained only traces of Persians in western Asia Minor; however, he considered Cappadocia "almost a living part of Persia".

Under Ariarathes IV, who was half Persian and half Macedonian Greek, Cappadocia came into relations with Rome, first as a foe espousing the cause of Antiochus the Great, then as an ally against Perseus of Macedon. The kings henceforward threw in their lot with the Republic as against the Seleucids, to whom they had been from time to time tributary. Ariarathes V marched with the Roman proconsul Publius Licinius Crassus Dives Mucianus against Aristonicus, a claimant to the throne of Pergamon, and their forces were annihilated (130 BC). The imbroglio which followed his death ultimately led to interference by the rising power of Pontus and the intrigues and wars which ended in the failure of the dynasty.

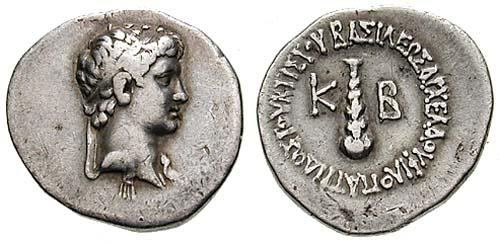
Drachm of Archelaus of Cappadocia, Caesarea mint. Dated year 22 (15/14 BC). (36 BC – 17 AD).

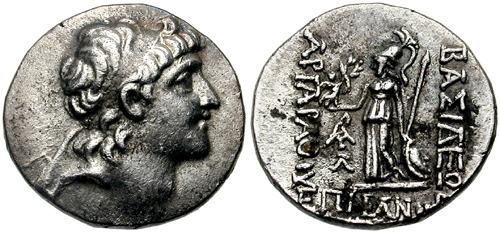
Ariarathes VI. 130-116 BC. AR Drachm (18 mm, 4.24 gm). Dated year 1=130/129 BC.

=== Roman and early Christian period ===
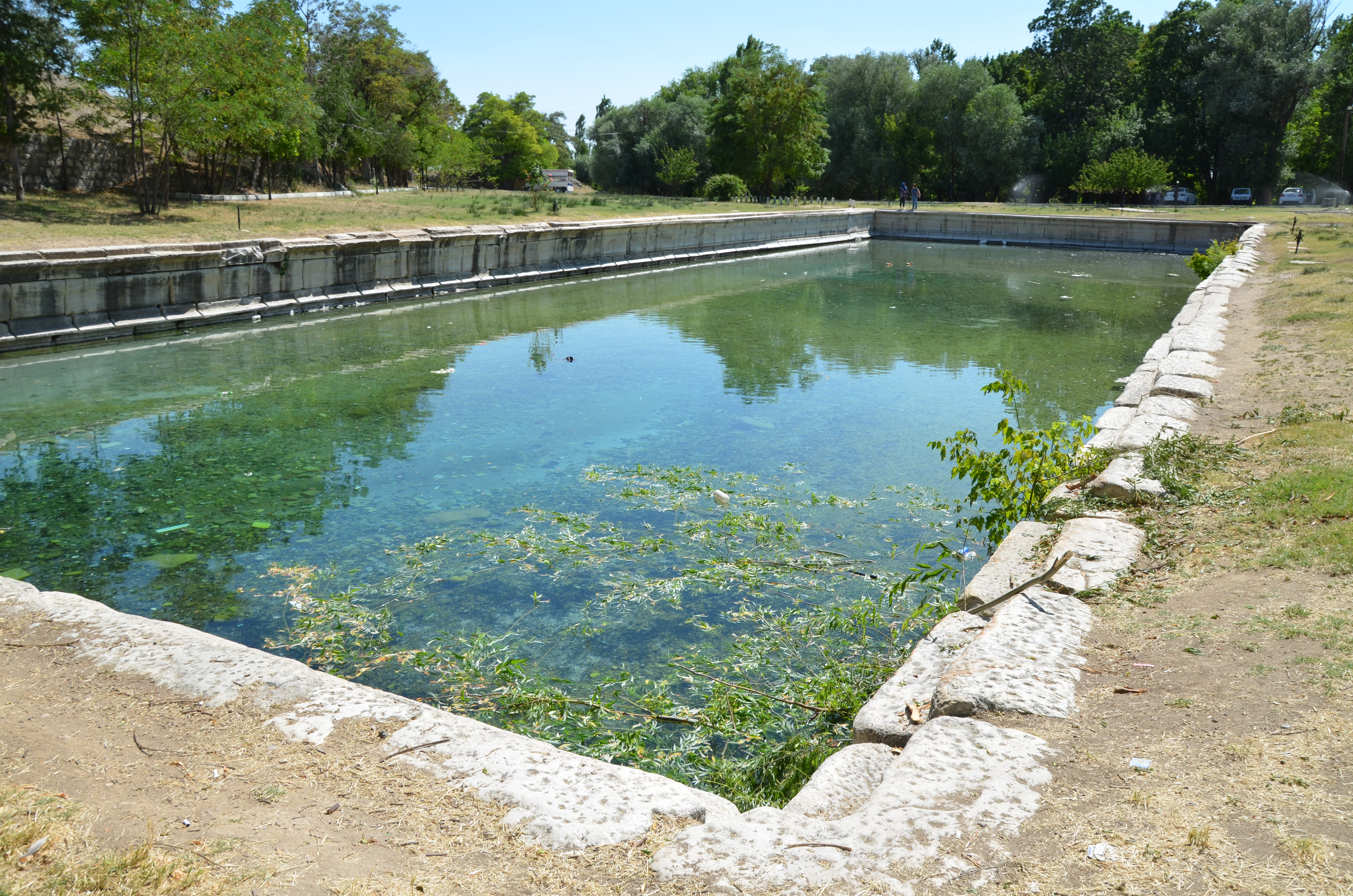
The ancient city of Tyana, Cappadocia

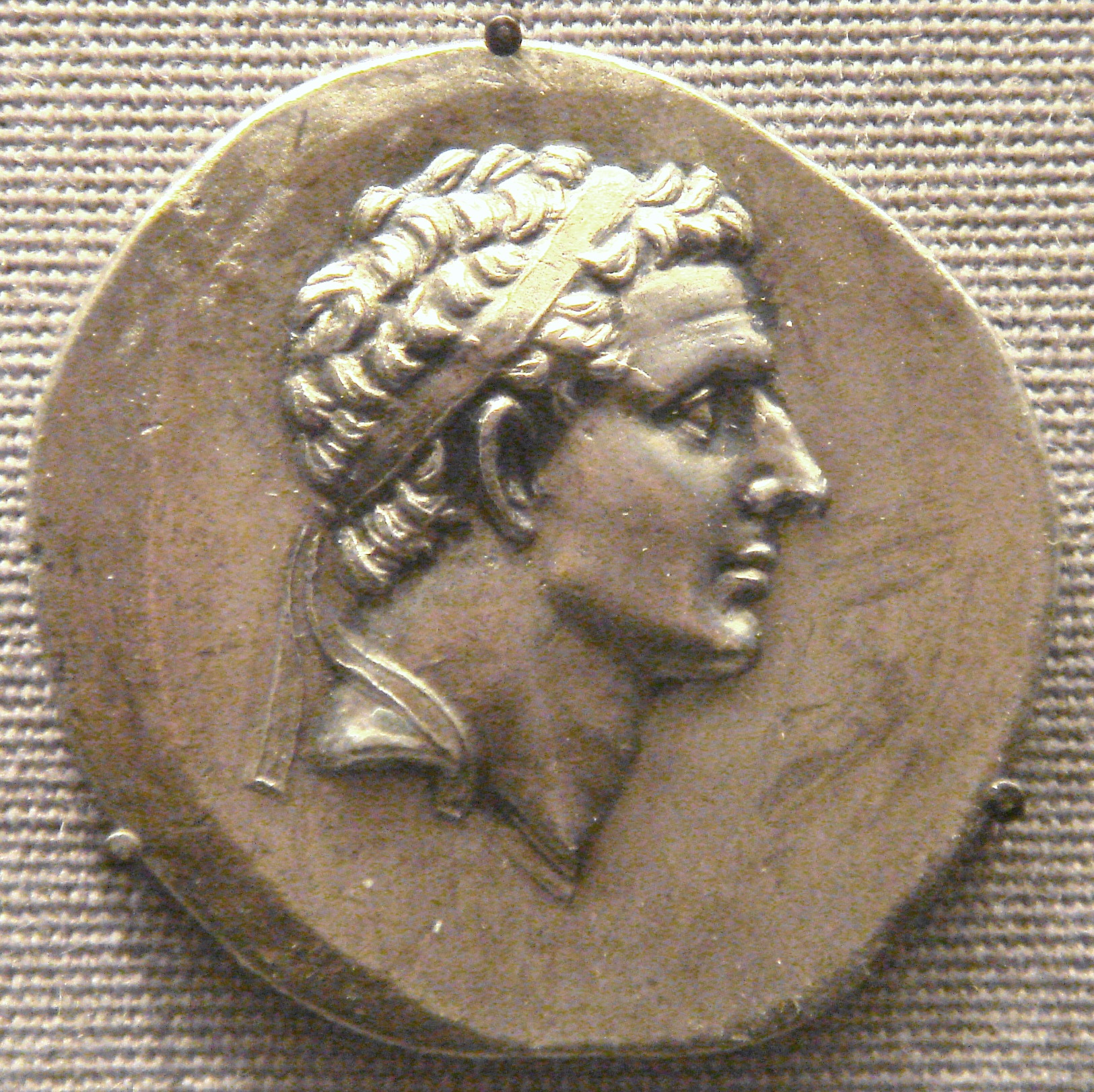
King Orophernes of Cappadocia

The Cappadocians, supported by Rome against Mithridates VI of Pontus, elected a native lord, Ariobarzanes, to succeed (93 BC). In the same year, Armenian troops under Tigranes the Great entered Cappadocia, dethroned king Ariobarzanes and crowned Gordios as the new client-king of Cappadocia, creating a buffer zone against the encroaching Romans. When Rome deposed the Pontic and Armenian kings, the rule of Ariobarzanes was established (63 BC).

In Caesar's civil war, Cappadocia was first for Pompey, then for Caesar, then for Antony, and finally, Octavian. The Ariobarzanes dynasty came to an end, a Cappadocian nobleman Archelaus was given the throne, by favour first of Antony and then of Octavian, and maintained tributary independence until AD 17, when the emperor Tiberius, whom he had angered, summoned him to Rome and reduced Cappadocia to a Roman province.

In 70 AD, Vespasian joined Armenia Minor to Cappadocia, and made the combined province a frontier bulwark. It remained, under various provincial redistributions, part of the Eastern Empire for centuries. In 314, Cappadocia was the largest province of the Roman Empire, and was part of the Diocese of Pontus. In 371, the western part of the Cappadocia province was divided into Cappadocia Prima, with its capital at Caesarea (modern-day Kayseri); and Cappadocia Secunda, with its capital at Tyana.

By 386, the region to the east of Caesarea had become part of Armenia Secunda, while the northeast had become part of Armenia Prima. Cappadocia largely consisted of major estates, owned by the Roman emperors or wealthy local families. The Cappadocian provinces became more important in the latter part of the 4th century, as the Romans were involved with the Sasanian Empire over control of Mesopotamia and "Armenia beyond the Euphrates".

Cappadocia, now well into the Roman era, still retained a significant Iranian character; Stephen Mitchell notes that "many inhabitants of Cappadocia were of Persian descent and Iranian fire worship is attested as late as 465", and the area also contained a sizeable Armenian population since antiquity, as well as a continuous Greek presence. By the 5th century, Greek had become the dominant language, replacing the native languages of Anatolia. For most of the Byzantine era Cappadocia remained relatively undisturbed by the conflicts in the area with the Sasanian Empire, but the Persian Wars of the 610s and 620s placed Cappadocia on the frontline for the first time since the first century.

The exact date of arrival of Christianity in uncertain, but latest from the third century it was firmly established in society and the Church was fully developed. The Cappadocian Fathers of the 4th century were integral to much of early Christian philosophy. It produced, among other people, John of Cappadocia, Patriarch of Constantinople from 517 to 520, and Macrina, an early champion of women's monasticism. The region suffered famine in 368 described as "the most severe ever remembered" by Gregory of Nazianzus:

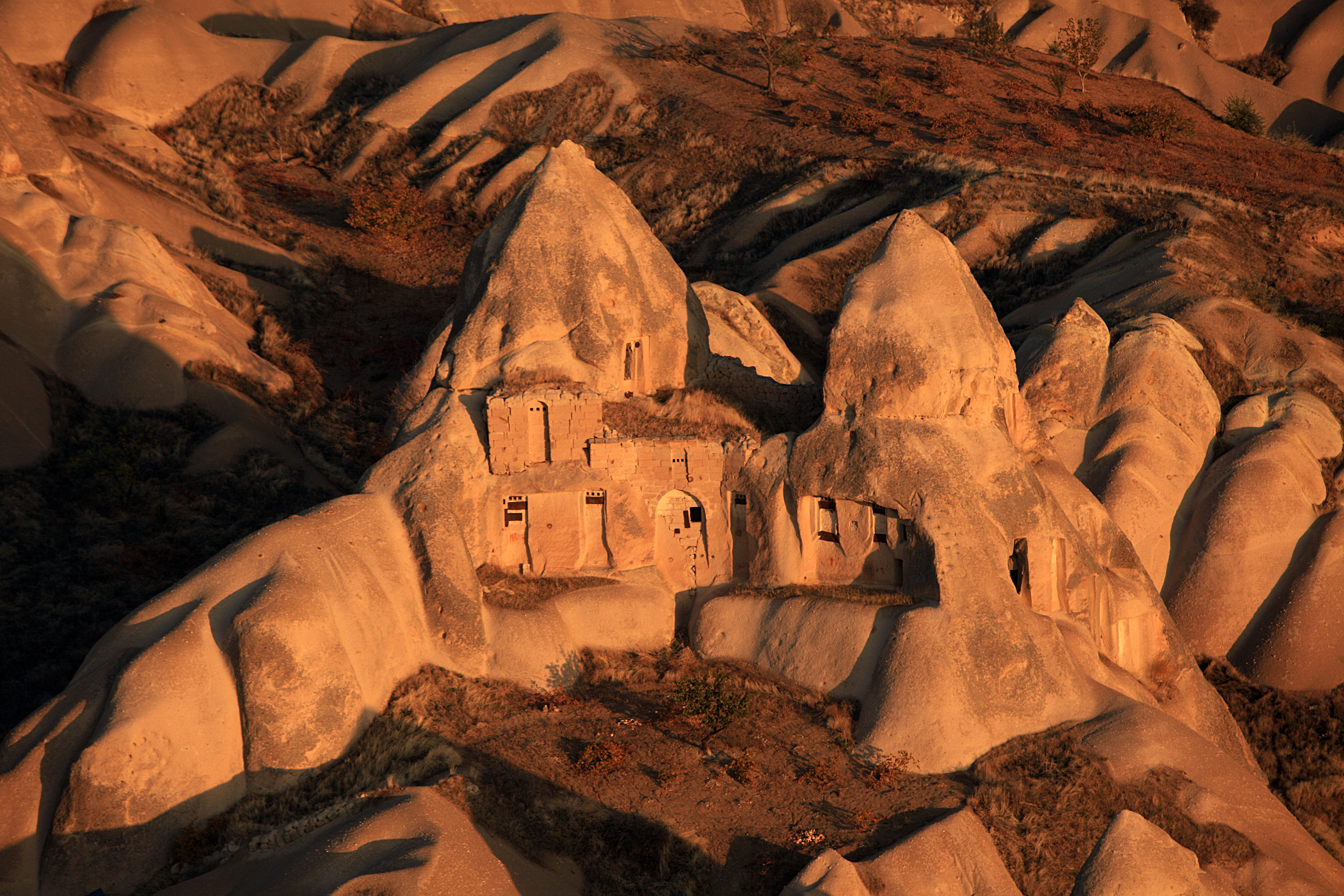
An early Christian hermitage in Cappadocia

The city was in distress and there was no source of assistance [...] The hardest part of all such distress is the insensibility and insatiability of those who possess supplies [...] Such are the buyers and sellers of corn [...] by his word and advice [Basil's] open the stores of those who possessed them, and so, according to the Scripture, dealt food to the hungry and satisfied the poor with bread [...] He gathered together the victims of the famine [...] and obtaining contributions of all sorts of food which can relieve famine, set before them basins of soup and such meat as was found preserved among us, on which the poor live [...] Such was our young furnisher of corn, and second Joseph [...] [But unlike Joseph, Basil's] services were gratuitous and his succour of the famine gained no profit, having only one object, to win kindly feelings by kindly treatment, and to gain by his rations of corn the heavenly blessings.

This is similar to another account by Gregory of Nyssa that Basil "ungrudgingly spent upon the poor his patrimony even before he was a priest, and most of all in the time of the famine, during which [Basil] was a ruler of the Church, though still a priest in the rank of presbyters; and afterwards did not hoard even what remained to him". Basil also famously constructed near Caeserea the Basileias, a vast complex with hospices for sick, churches, quarters for travellers and facilities for doctors and nurses.

=== Byzantine periods ===
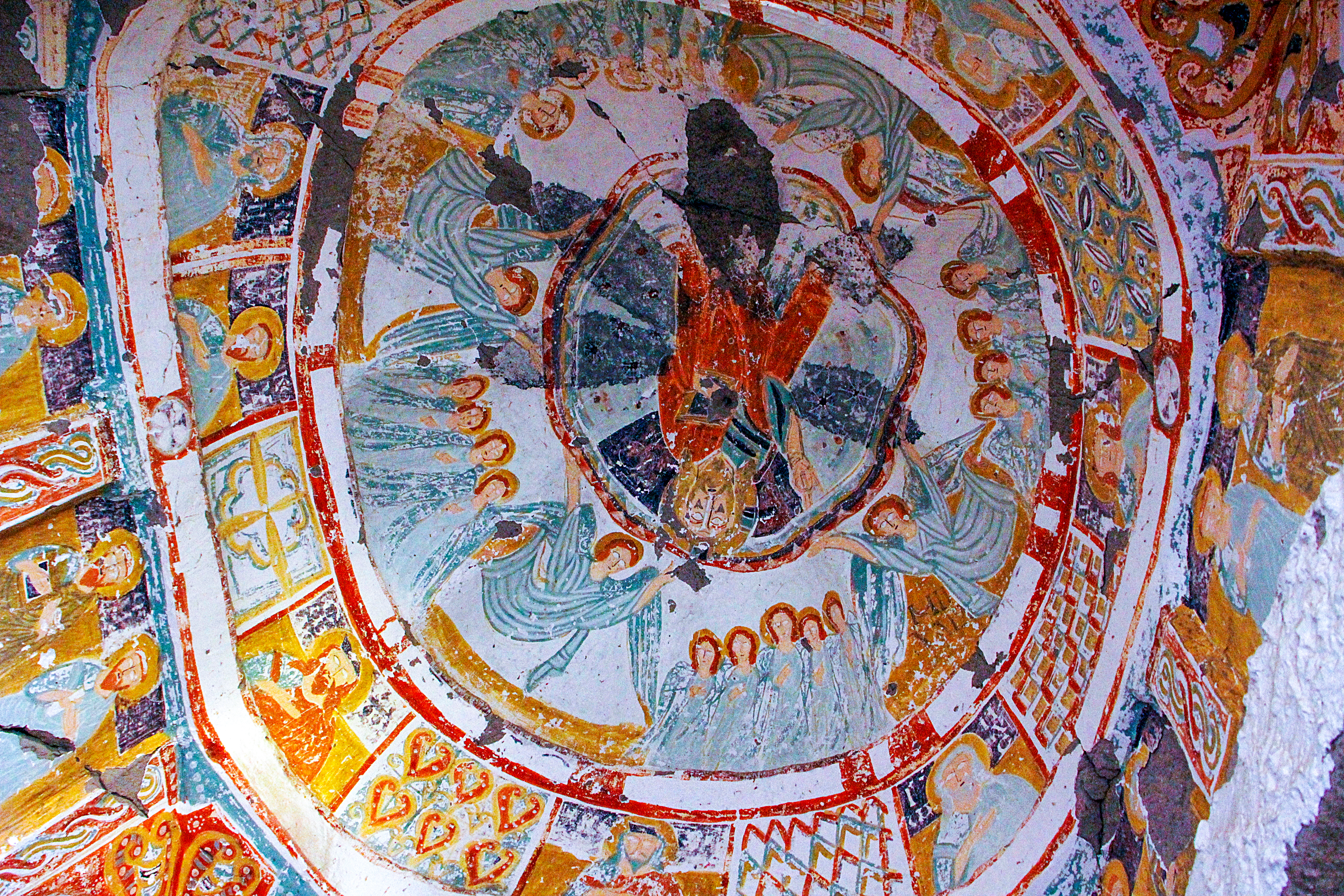
A ceiling fresco in Daniel Pantonassa Church, Ihlara Valley

The arrival of Muslim Arab armies in the mid-seventh century resulted in the breakdown of civil and military order in the Eastern provinces and a colossal displacement of population. Cappdocia became a border region of the Byzantine Empire, frequently raided by the Caliphate. From the 7th century, Cappadocia was divided between the Anatolic and Armeniac themes. The frontier zone between Caeserea (Kayseri) and Melitene became a no-man's land, in which the akritai and ghazis fought each other and which is remembered in the epic Digenes Akritas. The warfare, consisting of the yearly razzias as well as major campaigns took a heavy toll on the cities and villages, especially on the favourite Arab lines of march.

Between the 7th and 10th century, Cappadocia was a border region of the Byzantine Empire.

Cappadocia contains several underground cities (see Kaymaklı Underground City), many of which were dug by Christians to provide protection during the Arab raids and periods of persecution. The underground cities have vast defence networks of traps throughout their many levels. These traps are very creative, including such devices as large round stones to block doors and holes in the ceiling through which the defenders may drop spears.

Throughout the Dark Ages to the Middle Byzantine period, Armenians immigrated in significant numbers into Cappadocia, partly due to imperial policies. The Arab historian Abu Al Faraj asserts the following about Armenian settlers in Sebasteia, during the 10th century:

They [the Armenians] were assigned the Sebaste (now Siwas) district of Cappadocia. Their number grew to such an extent that they became valuable auxiliaries to the imperial armies. They were employed to garrison the fortresses reconquered from the Arabs (probably Membedj, Dolouk, etc.). They formed excellent infantry for the armies of Basileus in all wars, constantly fighting with courage and success alongside the Romans.

As a result of the Byzantine military campaigns and the Seljuk invasion of Armenia, the Armenians spread into Cappadocia and eastward from Cilicia into the mountainous areas of northern Syria and Mesopotamia, and the Armenian Kingdom of Cilicia was eventually formed. This immigration was increased further after the decline of the local imperial power and the establishment of the Crusader States following the Fourth Crusade. To the crusaders, Cappadocia was terra Hermeniorum, the land of the Armenians, due to the large number of Armenians settled there.

In the 9th–11th centuries, the region comprised the themes of Charsianon with its capital at the eponymous city and Cappadocia, which had first its capital in Nyssa and then at Koron, after Nyssa had been sacked by the Arabs in 838. By the mid-tenth century, the region was again reorganised as much of the no-men's land was resettled, especially around the area of Larissa, Tzamandos, and Lykandos. After the Byzantine reconquests in the East finished, Cappadocia was again removed from the frontier and an increasingly demilitarised region in the eleventh century.

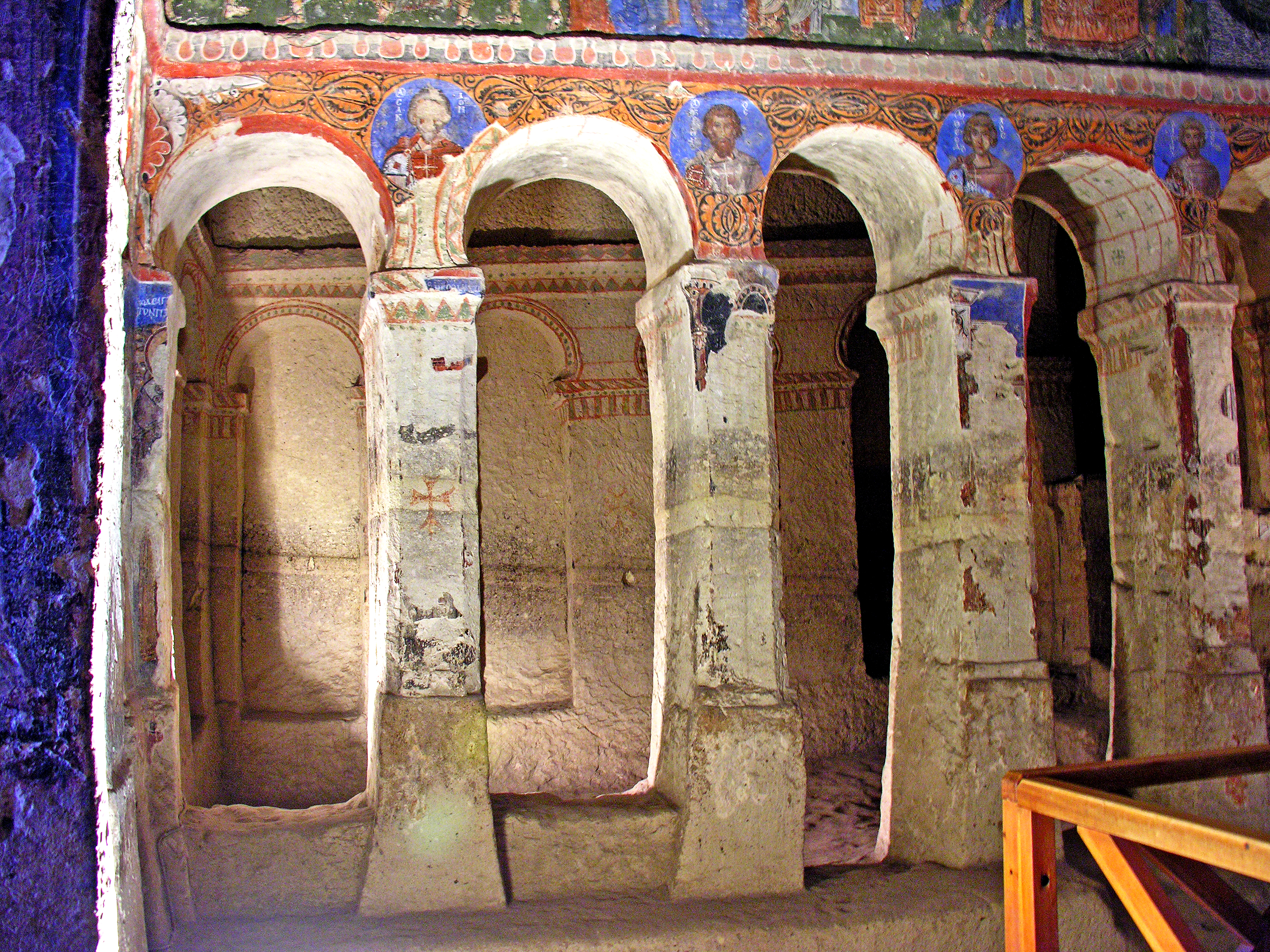
Frescos inside Tokali Kilise, "Church of the Buckle"

=== Turkish Cappadocia ===
Following the Battle of Manzikert in 1071, Turkish clans under the leadership of the Seljuks began settling in Anatolia. With the rise of Turkish power in Anatolia, Cappadocia slowly became a tributary to the Turkish states that were established to the east and to the west; some of the native population converted to Islam with the rest forming the remaining Cappadocian Greek population.

By the end of the early 12th century, Anatolian Seljuks had established their sole dominance over the region. With the decline and the fall of the Konya-based Seljuks in the second half of the 13th century, they were gradually replaced by successive Turkic ruled states: the Karaman-based Beylik of Karaman and then the Ottoman Empire. Cappadocia remained part of the Ottoman Empire until 1922, when it became part of the modern state of Turkey.

In the early 18th century, a fundamental change occurred in between when a new urban center, Nevşehir, was founded by a grand vizier who was a native of the locality (Nevşehirli Damat İbrahim Pasha), to serve as regional capital, a role the city continues to assume to this day. In the meantime many former Cappadocians had shifted to a Turkish dialect (written in Greek alphabet, Karamanlıca).

Where the Greek language was maintained (Sille, villages near Kayseri, Pharasa town and other nearby villages), it became heavily influenced by the surrounding Turkish. This dialect of Eastern Roman Greek is known as Cappadocian Greek. Following the foundation of Turkey in 1922, those who still identified with this pre-Islamic culture of Cappadocia were required to leave, so this language is now only spoken in Greece by the descendants of the few who did not shift to Modern Greek.

==== Church ====
Cappadocia Church (Turkish: Kapadokya Kilisesi) is a Christian church and local congregation in Avanos, a town in Nevşehir Province in Cappadocia. The church holds Turkish-language worship services within a Protestant theological framework, according to its own statements. Several online travel and business directories list it as one of the places of worship and visitation in Avanos.

== Modern tourism ==
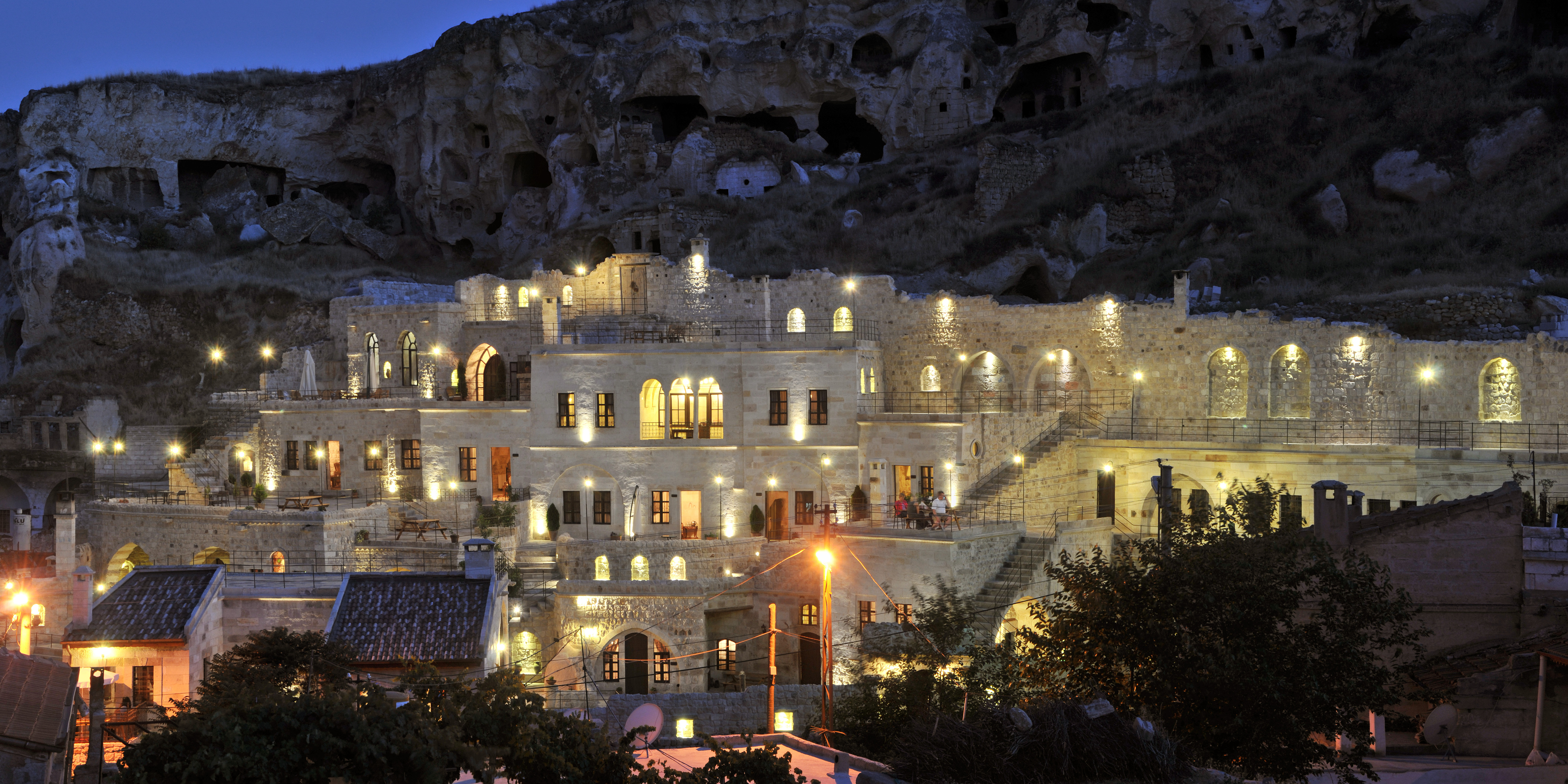
Cappadocia is famous for traditional cave hotels.

The area is a popular tourist destination, as it has many areas with unique geological, historic, cultural, and religious features. Touristic Cappadocia includes four cities: Nevşehir, Kayseri, Aksaray and Niğde.

The region is located southwest of the major city Kayseri, which has airline and railway service to Ankara and Istanbul and other cities.

The most important towns and destinations in Cappadocia are Ortahisar, Ürgüp, Göreme, Love Valley, Ihlara Valley, Selime, Güzelyurt, Uçhisar, Avanos and Zelve. Cappadocia is served by Nevşehir Kapadokya Airport (NAV), which functions as the region's primary airport. According to the Republic of Türkiye Directorate General of State Airports Authority (DHMİ), recent infrastructure and capacity expansion projects have increased the airport's annual passenger capacity to nearly 2 million, a level considered sufficient for the region's current tourism demand.

Sedimentary rocks formed in lakes and streams and ignimbrite deposits that erupted from ancient volcanoes approximately nine to three million years ago, during the late Miocene to Pliocene epochs, underlie the Cappadocia region. The rocks of Cappadocia near Göreme eroded into hundreds of spectacular pillars and minaret-like forms. People of the villages at the heart of the Cappadocia region carved out houses, churches and monasteries from the soft rocks of volcanic deposits.

Göreme became a Christian monastic centre in 300–1200 AD. The Yusuf Koç, Ortahane, Durmus Kadir and Bezirhane churches in Göreme, and houses and churches carved into rocks in the Uzundere, Bağıldere and Zemi Valleys, all evidence Cappadocia as a centre of early Christian learning and are thus a place of pilgrimage. The Göreme Open Air Museum is the most visited site of the Christian monastic communities in Cappadocia (see Churches of Göreme and Churches of the Ihlara Valley) and is one of the most famous sites in central Turkey. The complex contains more than 30 carved-from-rock churches and chapels, some having superb frescoes inside, dating from the ninth century to the eleventh century.

The three main castles in Cappadocia are Uçhisar Castle, Ortahisar Castle, and Ürgüp Kadıkalesi (Temenni Tepe). Among the most visited underground cities are Derinkuyu, Kaymakli, Gaziemir and Ozkonak. The best historic mansions and cave houses for tourist stays are in Ürgüp, Göreme, Güzelyurt and Uçhisar.

Hot-air ballooning is especially popular in Cappadocia, particularly around Göreme, offering sunrise flights over the region's fairy chimneys and valleys.

Trekking is practised in Ihlara Valley, Monastery Valley (Güzelyurt), Ürgüp and Göreme.

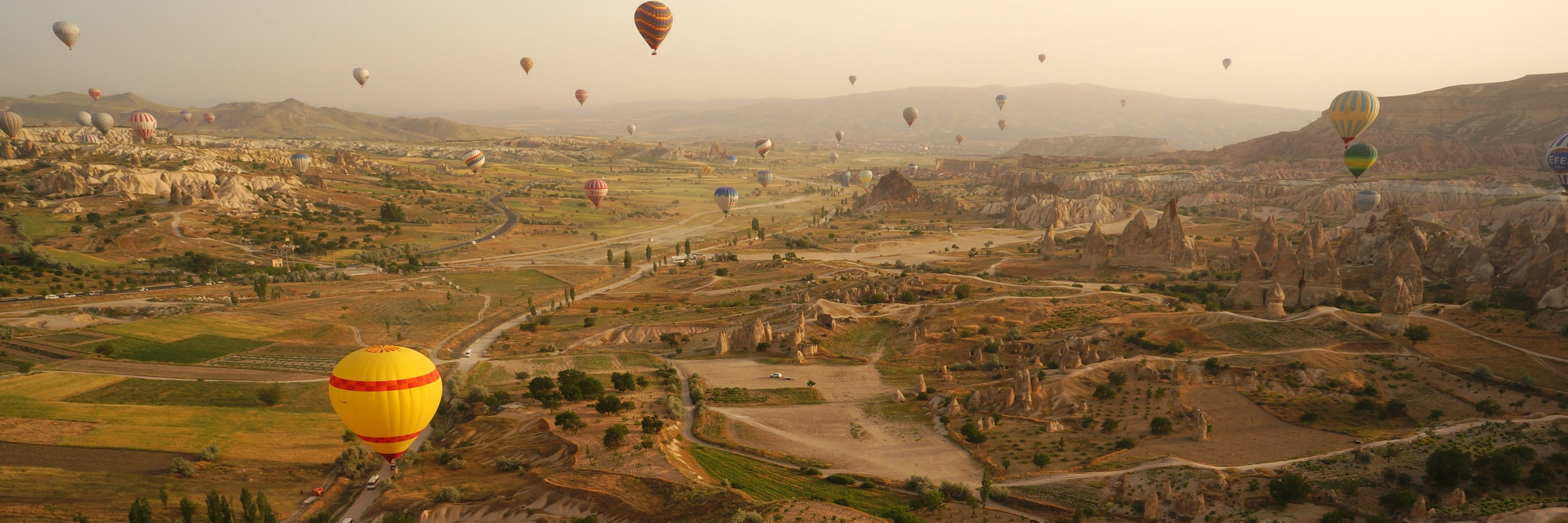
Hot air balloons

== Mesothelioma ==
In 1975, a study of three small villages in central Cappadocia—Tuzköy, Karain and Sarıhıdır—found that mesothelioma was causing 50% of all deaths. Initially, this was attributed to erionite, a zeolite mineral with similar properties to asbestos, but detailed epidemiological investigation demonstrated that the substance causes the disease mostly in families with a genetic predisposition to mineral fiber carcinogenesis. The studies are being extended to other parts of the region.

== Media ==
A video showing all the different landscapes and terrain of Göreme and Cappadocia

The area was featured in several films due to its topography. The 1983 Italian/French/Turkish film Yor, the Hunter from the Future and 1985's Land of Doom were filmed in Cappadocia. The region was used for the 1989 science fiction film Slipstream to depict a cult of wind worshippers. In 2010 and early 2011, the film Ghost Rider: Spirit of Vengeance was filmed in the Cappadocia region.

Autechre's second album, Amber, features a photo of this region's fairy mountains as the cover art, being their only album whose cover is not computer-generated.

Cappadocia's winter landscapes and broad panoramas are prominent in the 2014 film Winter Sleep (Turkish: Kış Uykusu), directed by Nuri Bilge Ceylan, which won the Palme d'Or at the 2014 Cannes Film Festival.

The 2011 video game Assassin's Creed Revelations features the city as a major location, where the protagonist Ezio Auditore travels to in a bid to stop the Byzantine Templars and their operations, kill Manuel Palaiologos and recover the final Masyaf key.

== Sports ==
Since 2012, a multiday track running ultramarathon of desert concept, called Runfire Cappadocia Ultramarathon, is held annually in July. The race tours 244 km (152 mi) in six days through several places across Cappadocia reaching out to Lake Tuz. In September 2016, for the first time, the Turkish Presidential Bike Tour took place in Cappadocia, with more than 300 cyclists from around the globe participating.

== Gallery ==
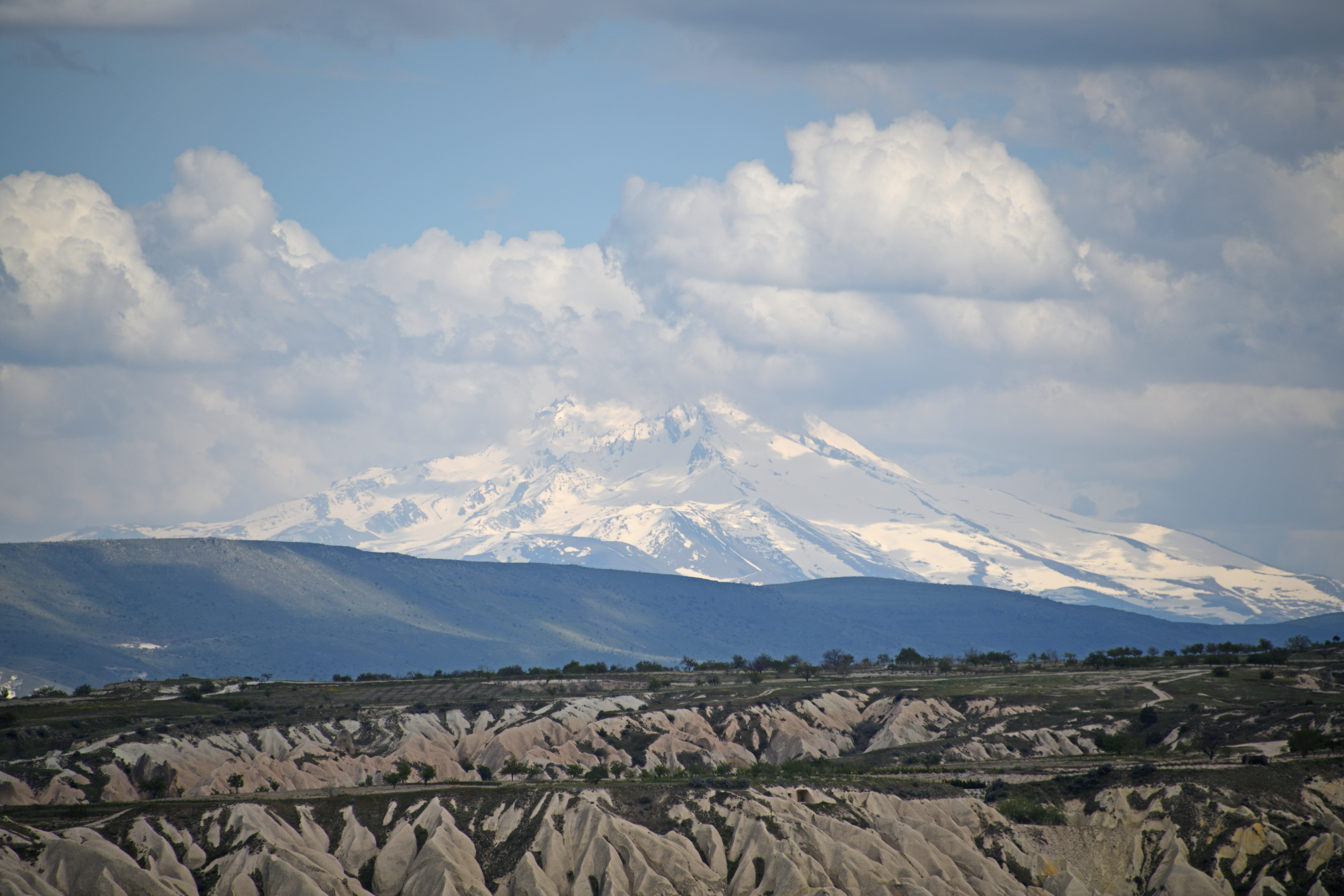
Mt. Erciyes (3916 m), the highest mountain in Cappadocia

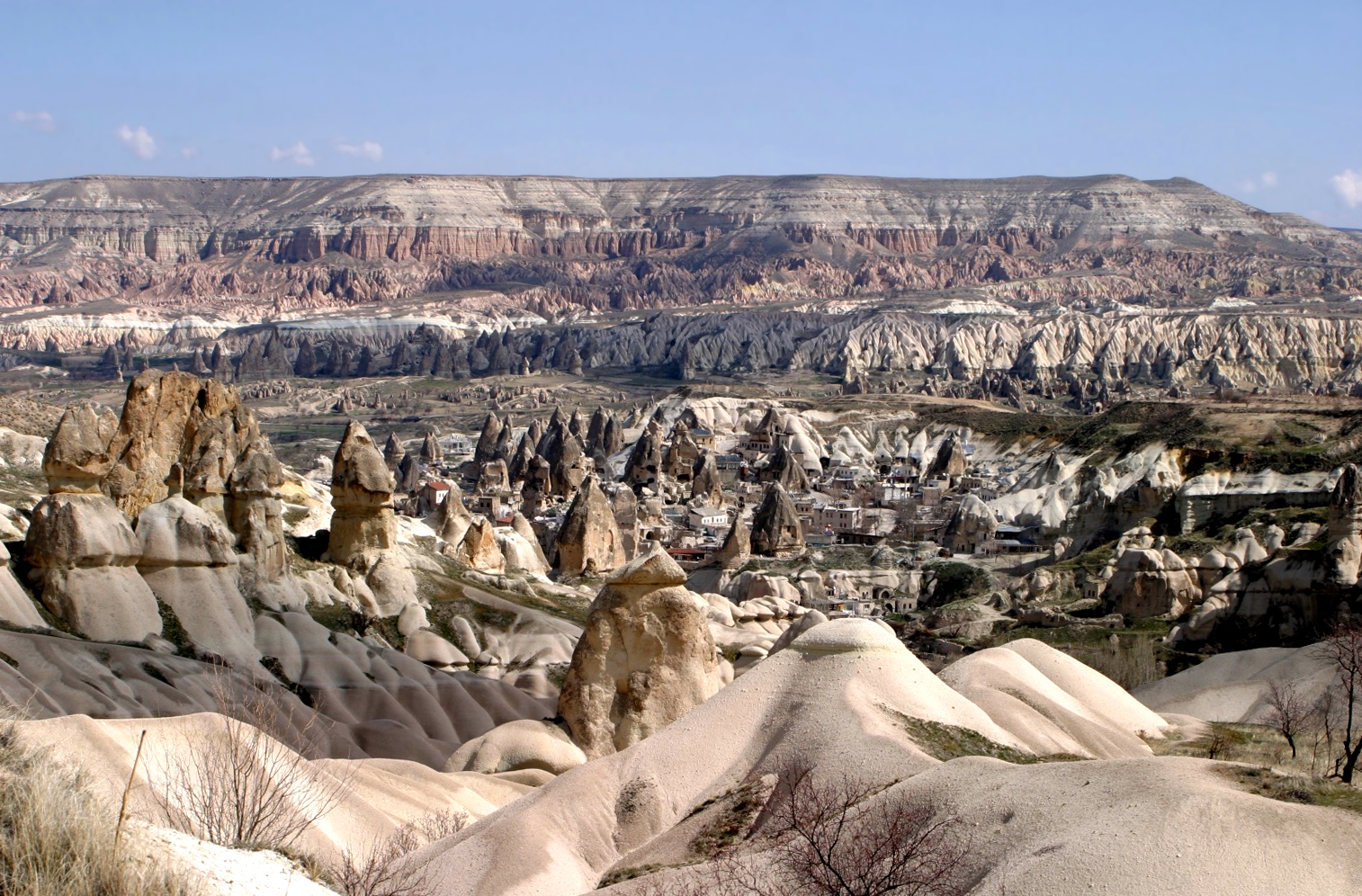
The town Göreme with rock houses in front of the spectacularly coloured valleys nearby

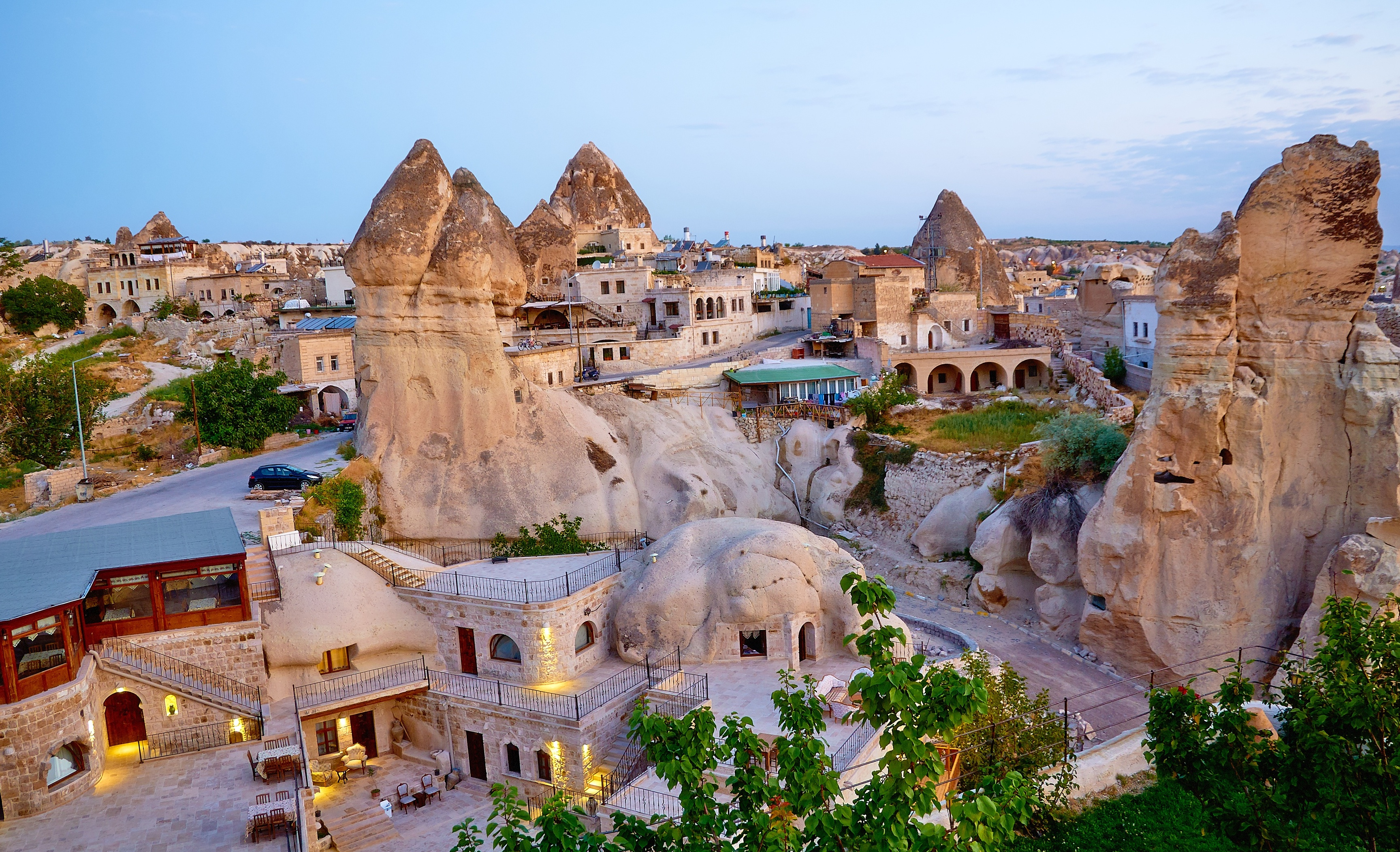
Town of Goreme during the blue hour just before the sunrise

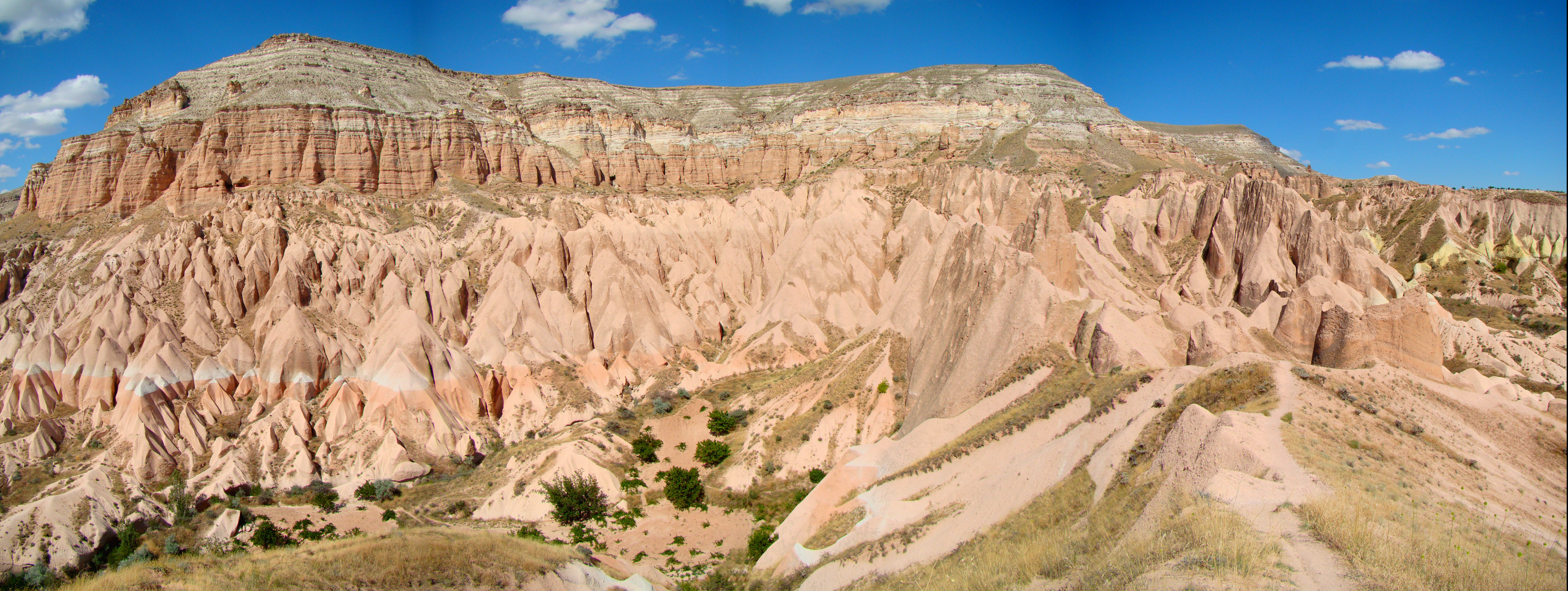
Aktepe "White Hill" near Göreme and the Rock Sites of Cappadocia (UNESCO World Heritage Site)

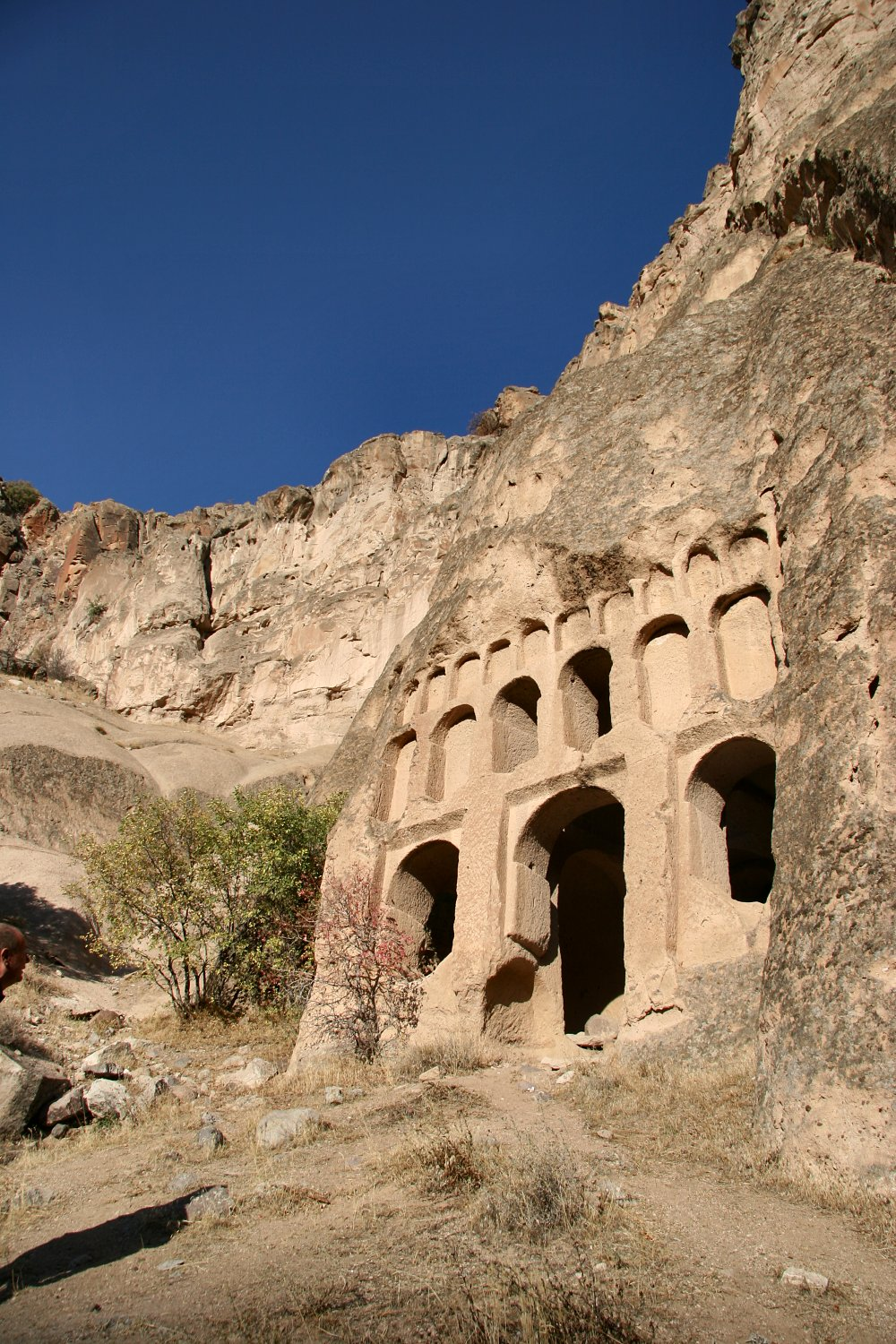
A rock-cut temple in Ihlara valley, Cappadocia

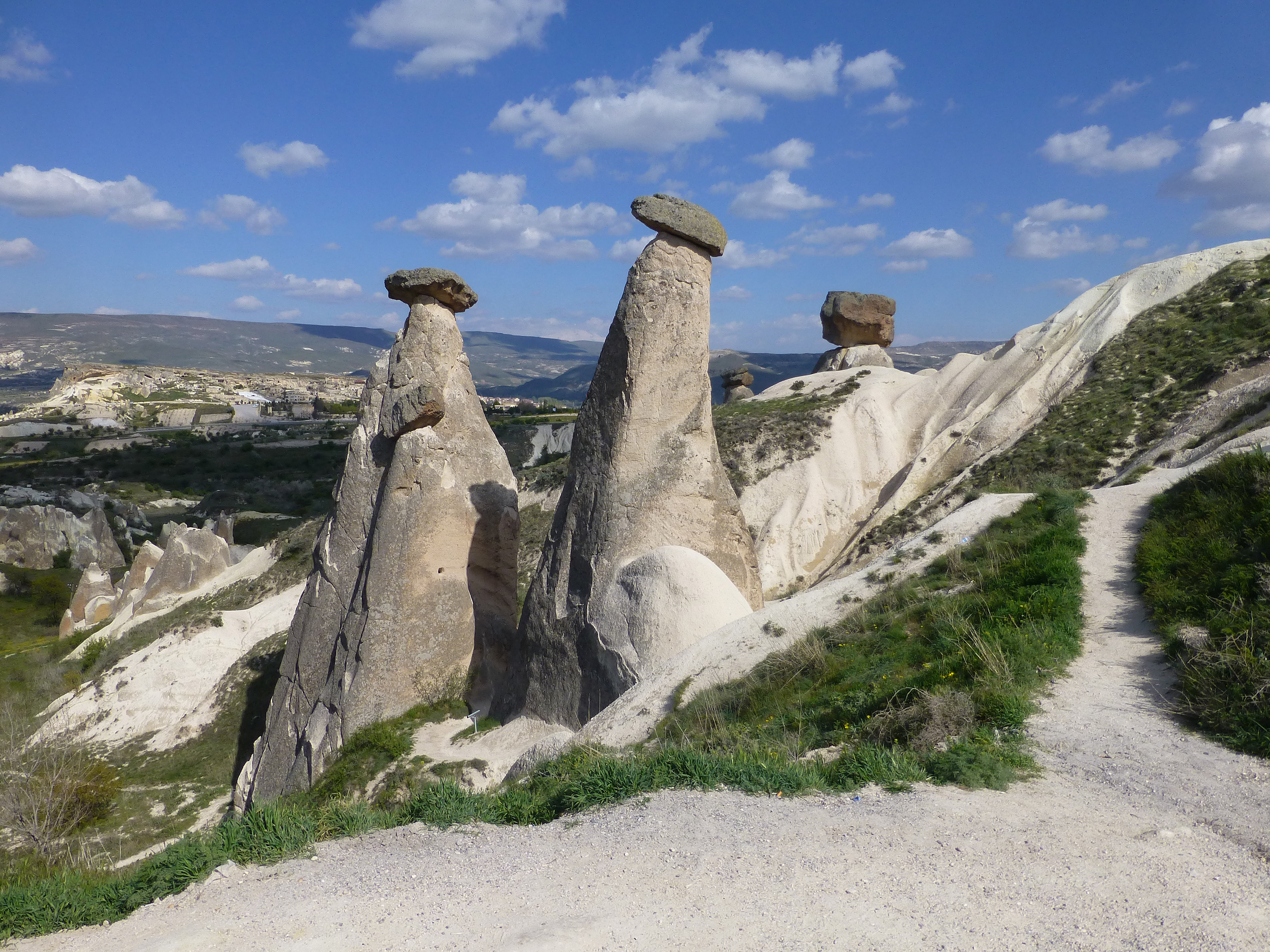
Üç Güzeller, 'The Three Graces' Fairy chimneys in Ürgüp

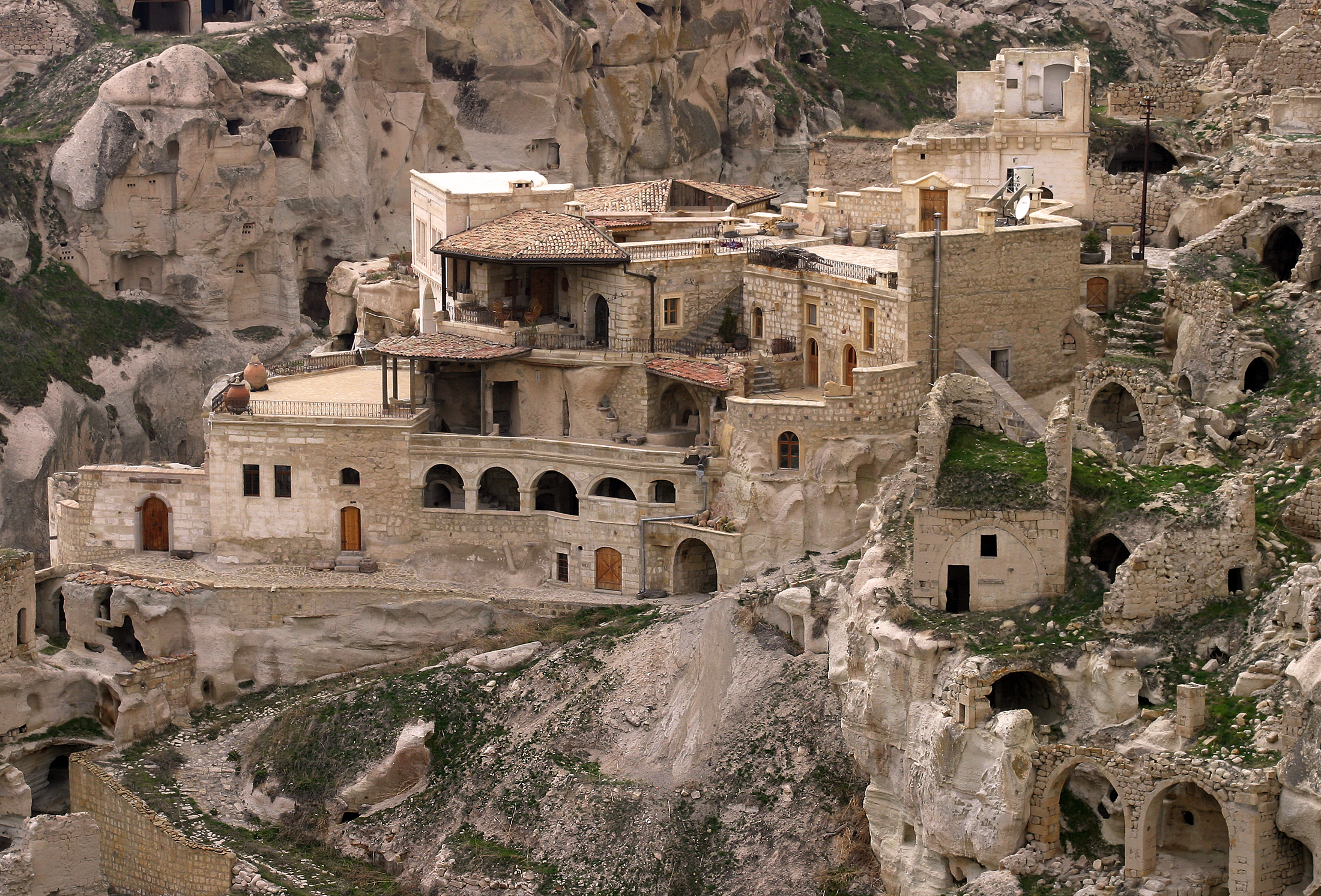
A house in Cappadocia

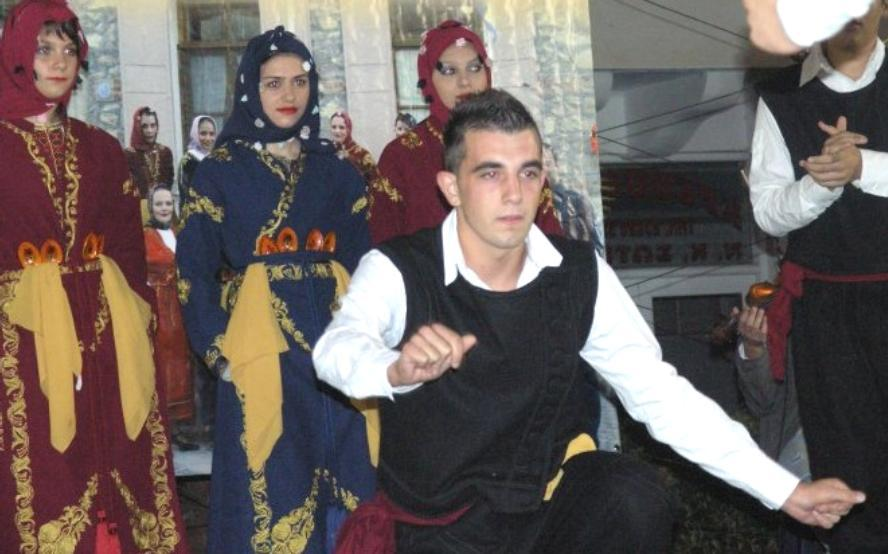
Cappadocian Greeks in traditional clothing

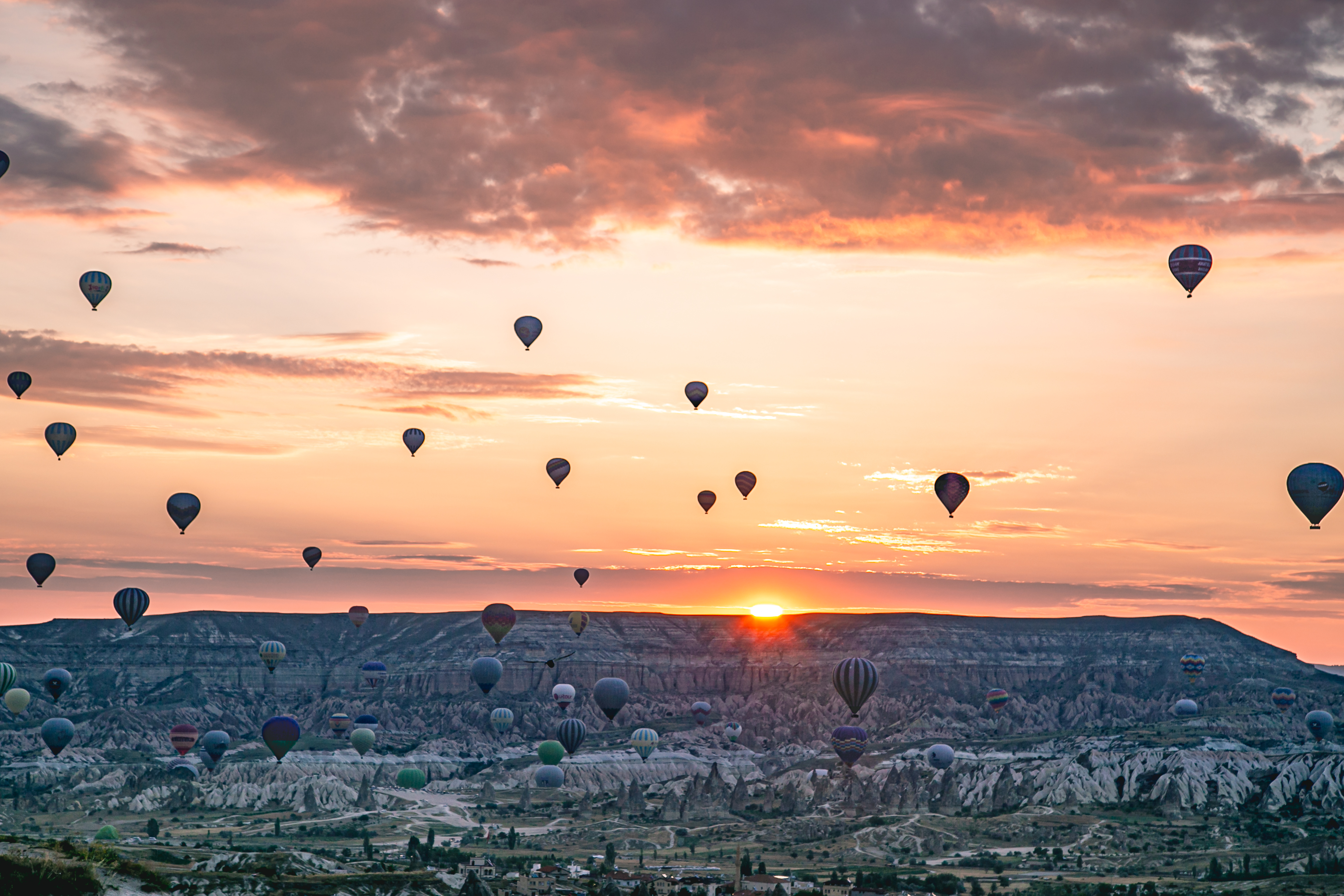
Balloons taking off at sunrise

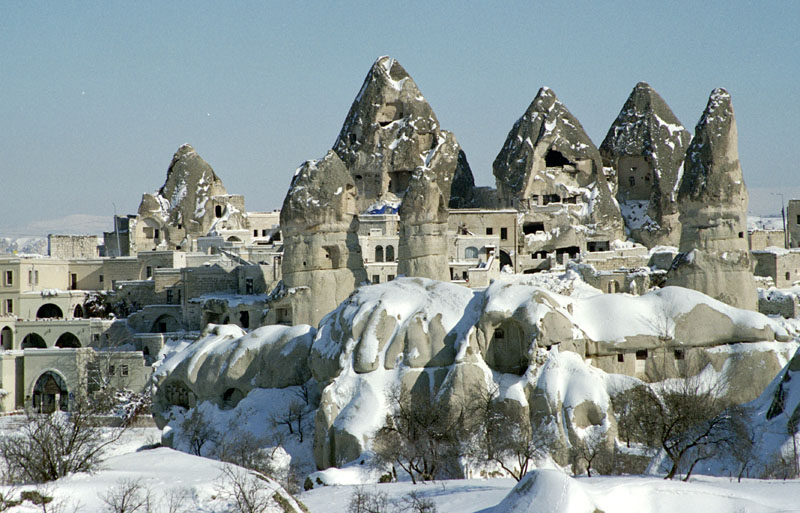
Göreme in winter

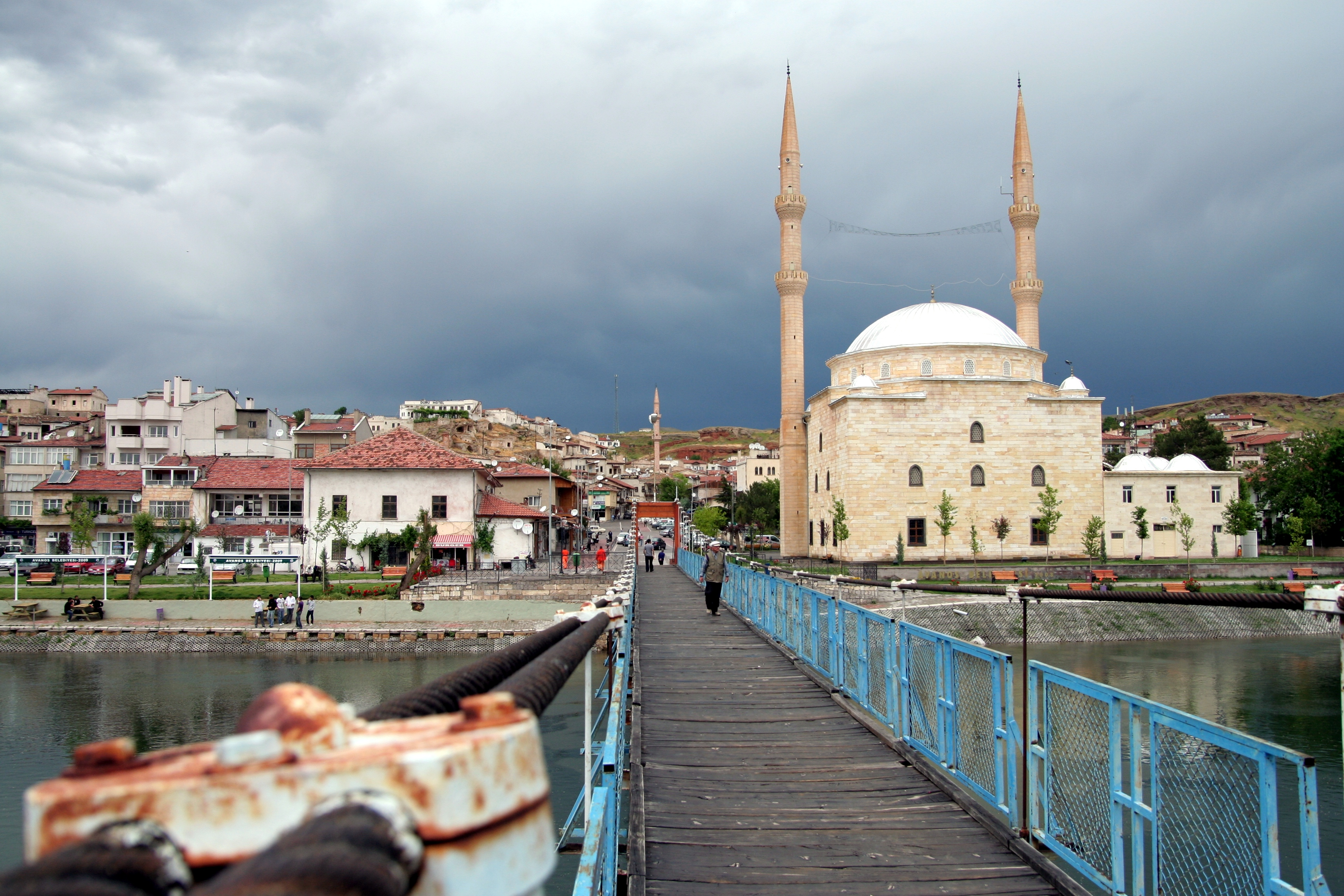
Avanos is a town in Cappadocia renowned for its clay pottery

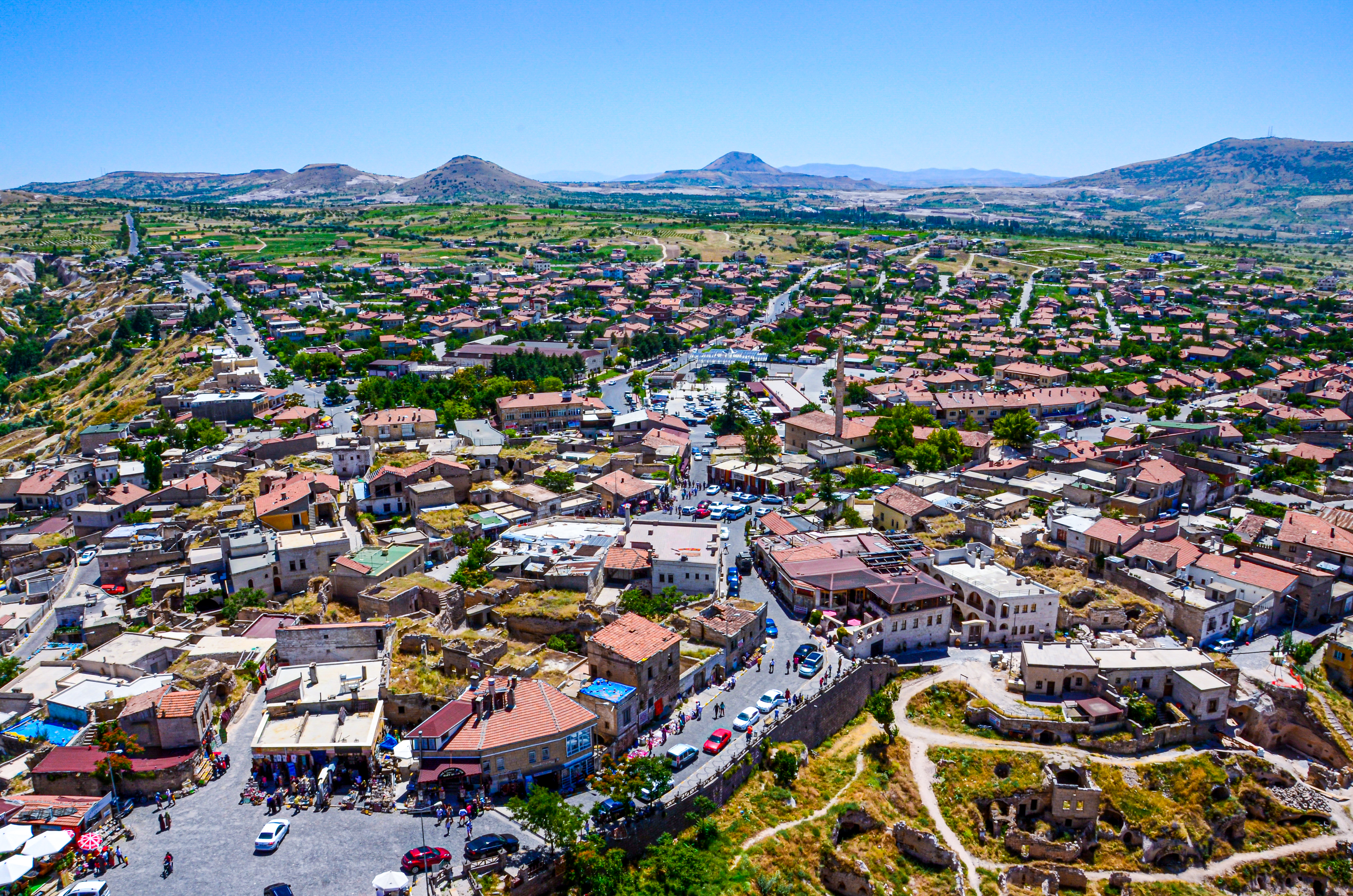
An aerial view of Uçhisar

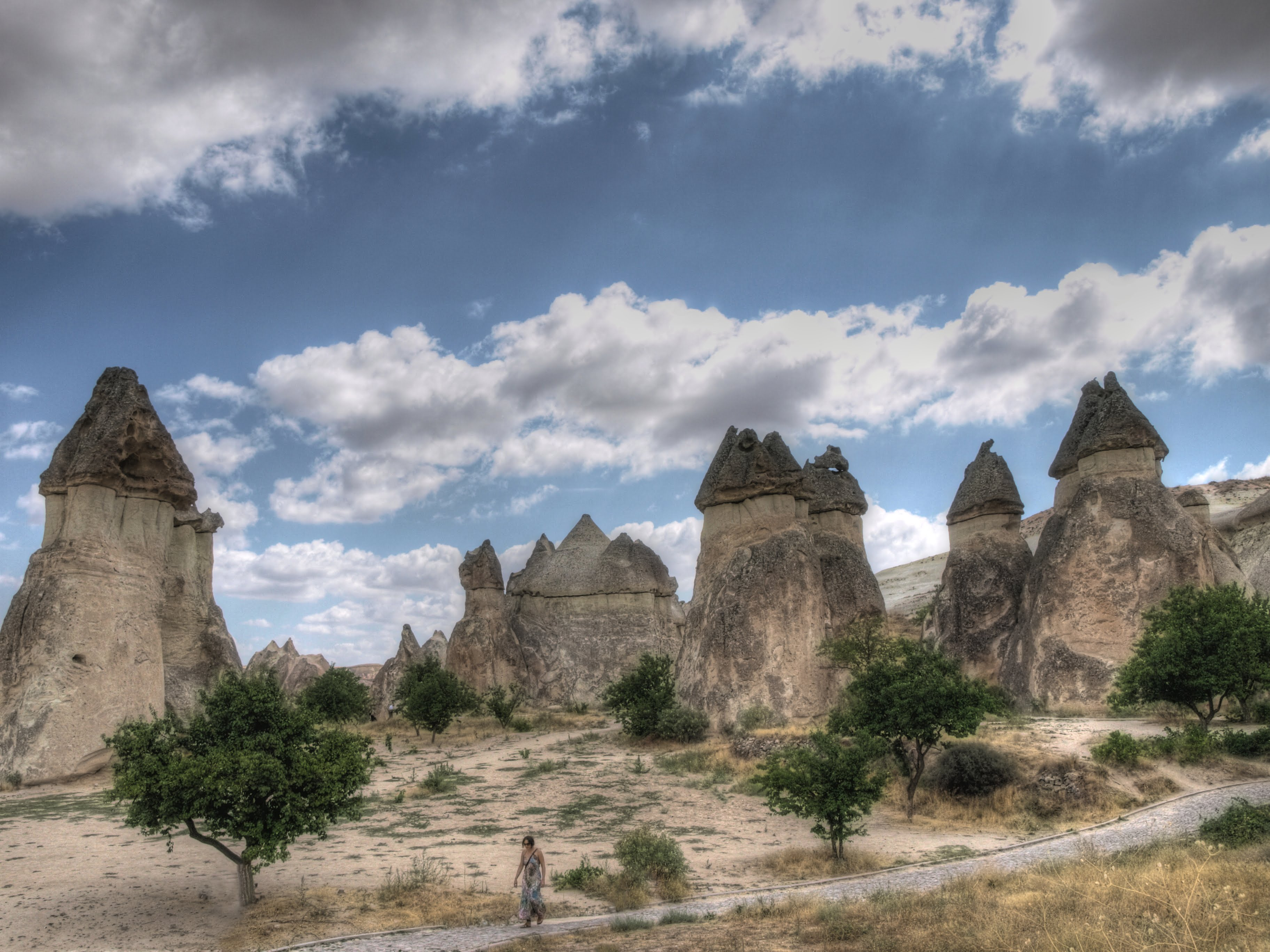
Ürgüp

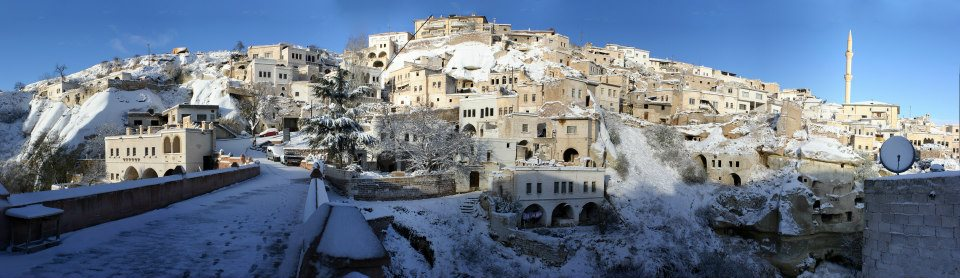
Panoramic view of Babayan under snow

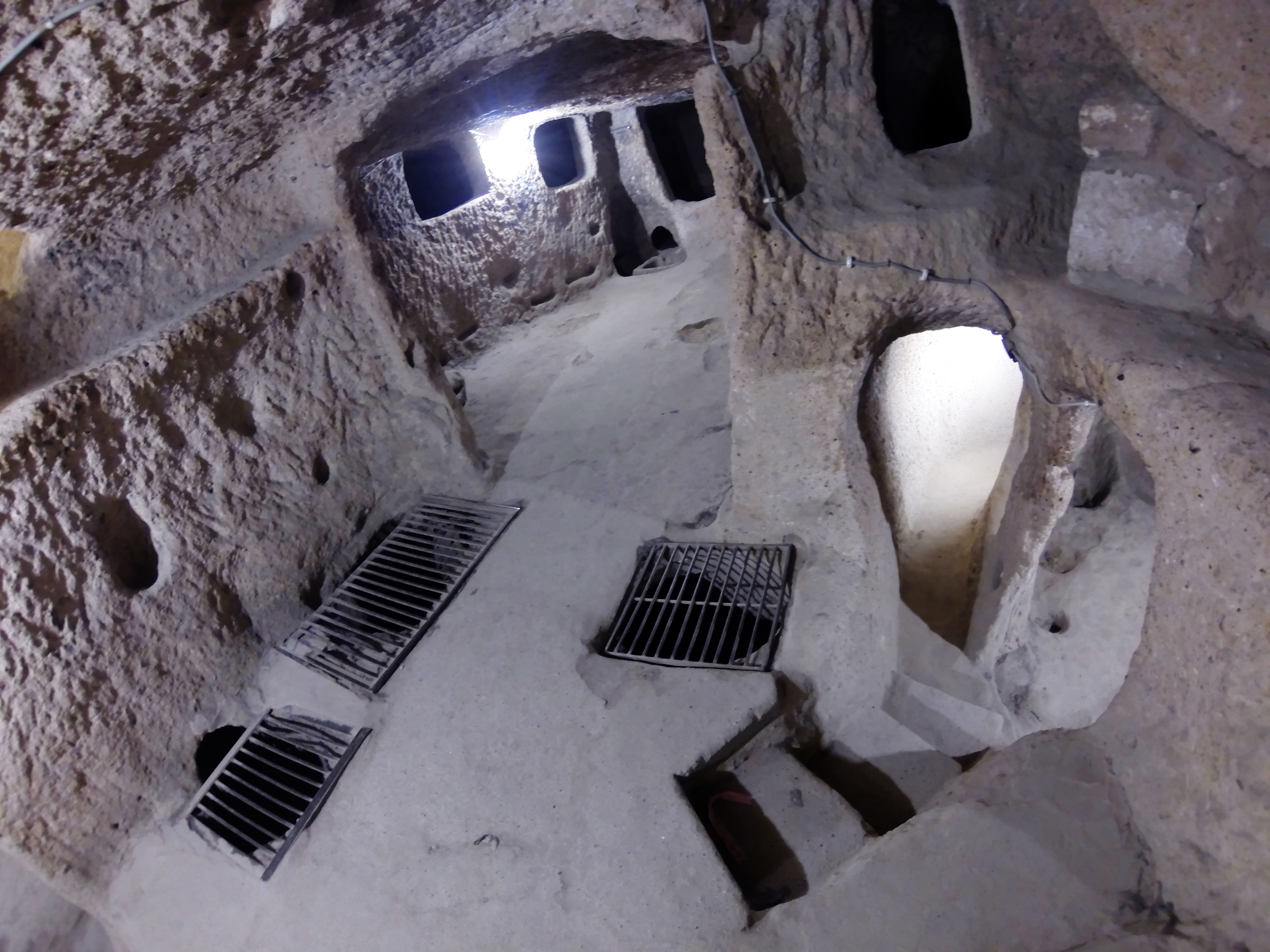
Kaymakli underground city

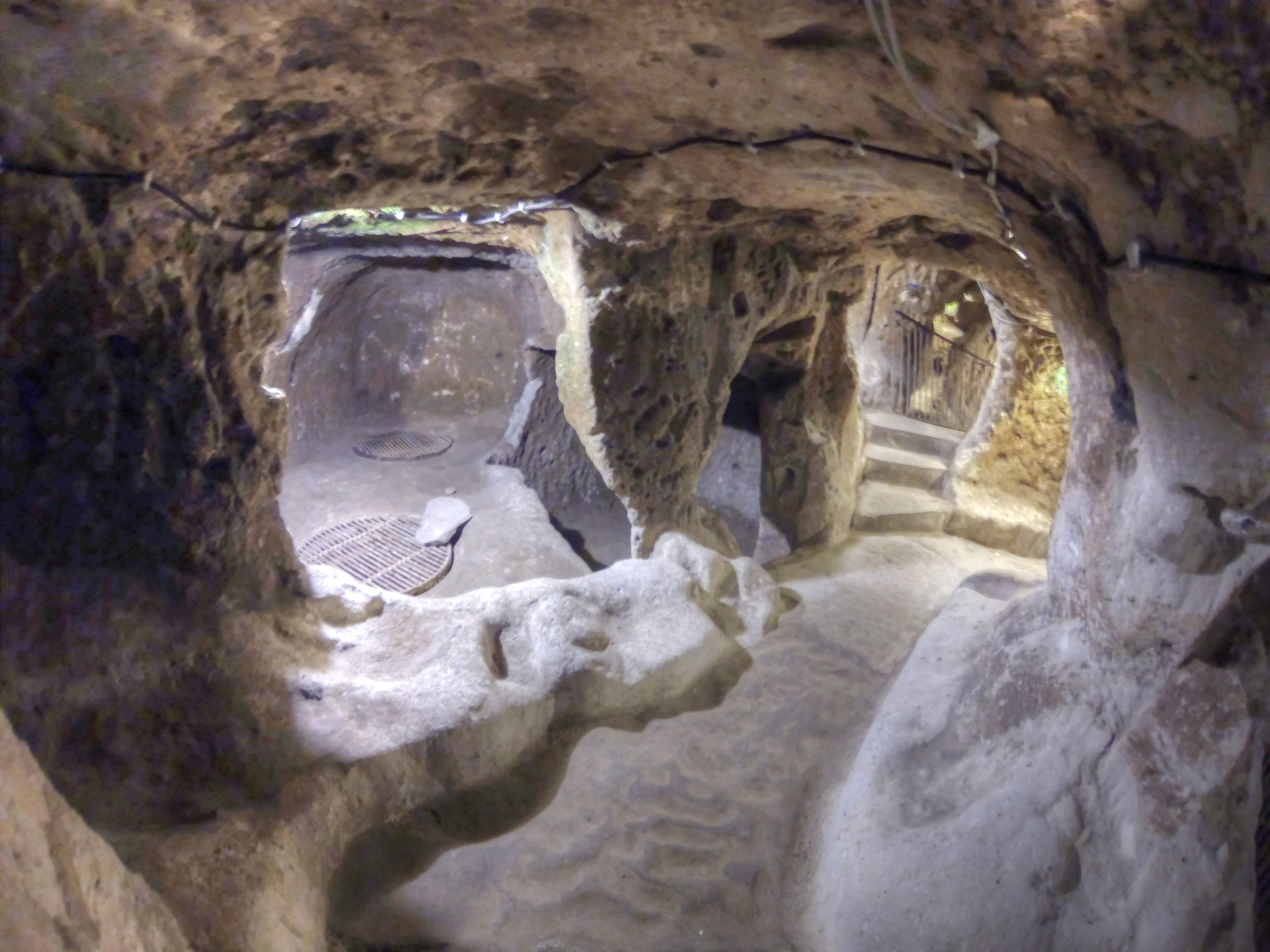
Derinkuyu underground city

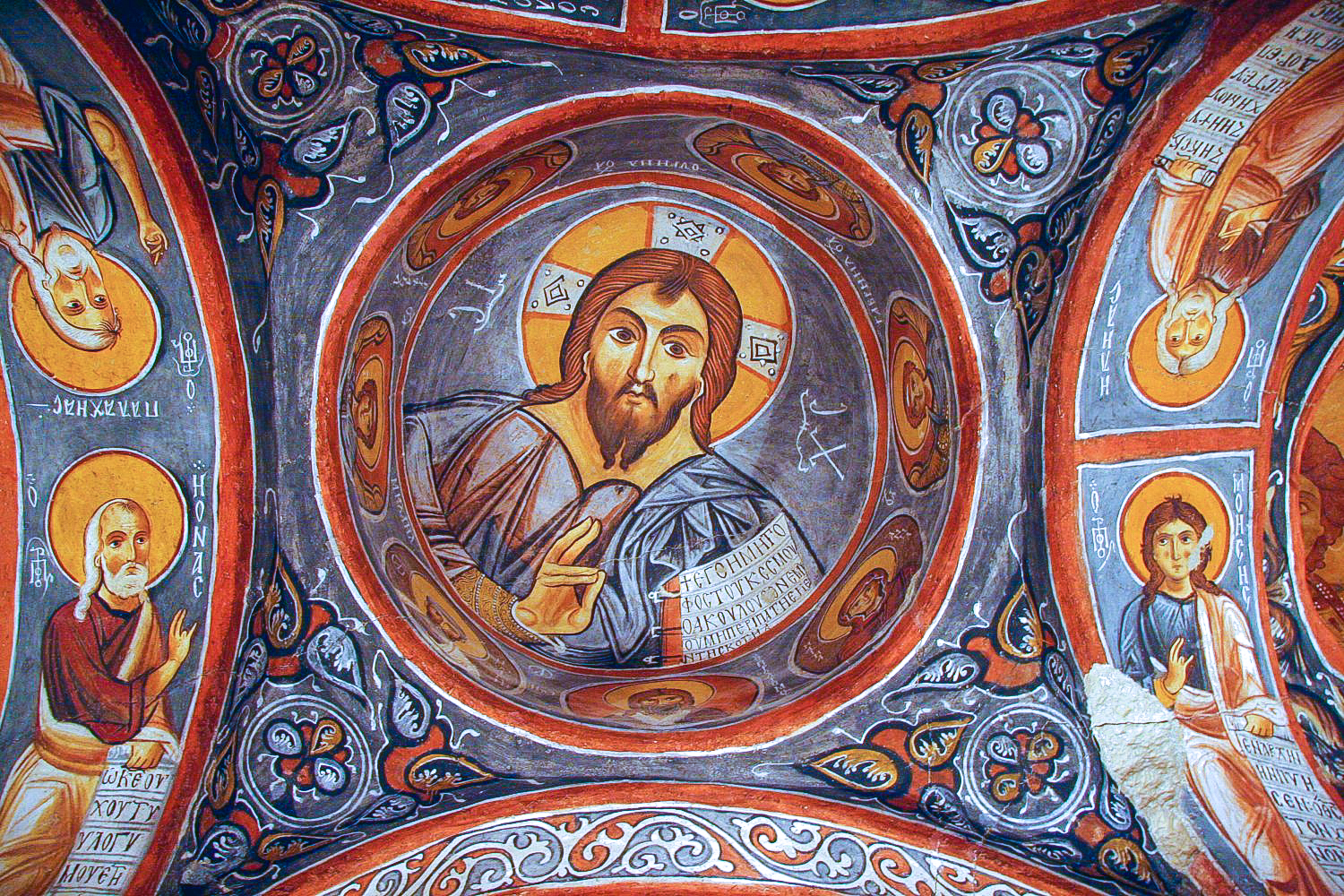
Fresco on the ceiling of Karanlık Kilise Churches of Göreme.

== See also ==
- Amaseia
- Ancient regions of Anatolia
- Cappadocian Fathers
- Cappadocia under the Achaemenids
- Kandovan, Iran
- Gondrani, Pakistan
- Khndzoresk, Armenia
- Syunik (historical province)
- List of colossal sculpture in situ
- List of traditional Greek place names
- Mokissos
- Tourism in Turkey

== Sources ==
- Cooper, Eric; Decker, Michael J. (24 July 2012). Life and Society in Byzantine Cappadocia. Springer. ISBN 978-1-137-02964-5.
- Kuzucuoǧlu, Catherine (2019). Landscapes and Landforms of Turkey. Cham: Springer. ISBN 9783030035150.
- Mitchell, Stephen (2018). "Cappadocia". In Nicholson, Oliver (ed.). The Oxford Dictionary of Late Antiquity. Oxford University Press. ISBN 978-0192562463.
- Raditsa, Leo (1983). "Iranians in Asia Minor". In Yarshater, Ehsan (ed.). The Cambridge History of Iran, Vol. 3 (1): The Seleucid, Parthian and Sasanian periods. Cambridge University Press. ISBN 978-1139054942.
- Weiskopf, Michael (1990). "Cappadocia". Encyclopaedia Iranica, Vol. IV, Fasc. 7–8. pp. 780–86.
- Ene Drăghici-Vasilescu, Elena, book "Byzantine and Medieval Cappadocia', Scientific Research Publishing |2024|978–1649979582|and Ene Drăghici-Vasilescu, Elena, "Shrines and Schools in Byzantine Cappadocia", Journal of Early Christian History, volume 9, Issue 1, 2019, pp. 1–29
