= Kayakapı =

Neighbourhood of Ürgüp, Turkey

Kayakapi Neighbourhood
- Kayakapı Mahallesi (Turkish)
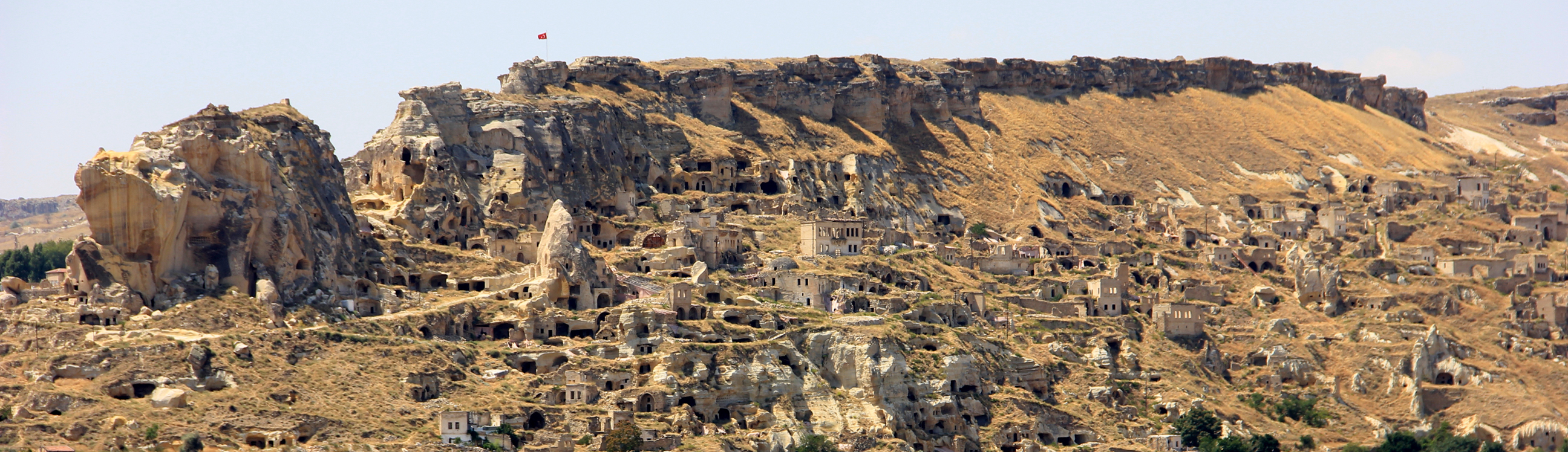
- Panoramic view over Kayakapi

- Location within Turkey
- 38.634634°N 34.905869°E
- Type: Settlement
- Location: Ürgüp, Turkey
- Region: Central Anatolia Region

Site notes
- Owner: Mixed public and private
- Management: Dinler Hotels Group

The Kayakapi neighbourhood of Ürgüp, Turkey is a historical area located on the northeastern slope of a hill known as Esbelli. It features many examples of vernacular and monumental architecture, including the House of Saint John the Russian (Yuhannes). Abandoned after the 1980s, the semi-ruins and natural landscape of Kayakapi are now being developed for tourism.

== Natural Environment ==
The geographical context within which Kayakapi Neighbourhood is located is characterized by a semi-mountainous landscape and volcanic tuff, pumice and basalt rocks. The fairy chimneys uniquely found in this region of Anatolia and the tradition of rock-carved houses are a result of the nature of this special kind of soft tuff stone.

The most prominent river in the province is Kızılırmak (Halys), with secondary rivers flowing down from Hodul Mountain (1.949m) and joining it; among these, Damsa river is also the site of the region's only lake and the valley on which Ürgüp is situated.

A severe inland climate dominates the area, with seasonal and day-to-night temperature differences exceeding 20 °C. However, these differences are only about 3 – 4 °C in caves and underground cities, creating natural storage spaces for wine and lemons. The natural vegetation of Ürgüp and environs consists of steppe plants, as well as orchards and vineyards; some wet and dry agricultural lands are also found around Ürgüp. Few forest areas are observed, except remains of older oak trees in the mountains.

== Cultural Environment ==
=== Archaeological Heritage ===
The historical development of Ürgüp and the region can be traced back to 1800–1200 BC, to the Hittite period, and continues from the Phrygian, Persian, Roman and Byzantine periods onto the Seljukid and Ottoman Empires. The ‘land of beautiful horses’, as it was called by the Persians, is renowned for the rock-carved shelters that were made by the early Christians fleeing the wave of iconoclasm which spread in the Byzantine Empire, and later by those who escaped the Arab attacks during the 8th – 9th centuries AD. The region is believed to be used as a missionary center, starting from the 1st – 2nd centuries AD, when the first Christian communities appeared, leading the construction of many churches and monasteries in Ürgüp – Göreme, which is now a Historical National Park, and in neighbouring areas. Nevşehir, Ihlara and Soğanlı are the three valleys where this kind of life was prevalent. Among the nearly 200 underground cities in Cappadocia, 45 of them are in Nevşehir Province.

An important find dating from the late Roman – early Byzantine period is a very large floor mosaic and building complex, the first of its kind in the region, which was uncovered by the Nevşehir Museum officials, in Şahin Efendi (Söviş) village, near Soğanlı Valley, in early 2002.

From later periods, Rükneddin Kılıç Aslan and Altıkapılı Mausoleums (Türbe) should be mentioned. One of the important Islamic monuments in this region is the Taşkınpaşa Complex (Külliye) in Damsa Village, which is known to exist since the Karamanoğlu Principality.

It is noteworthy that in the 19th century, Cappadocian settlements such as Mustafapaşa (Sinasos), Derinkuyu (Malekopia) and Ürgüp hosted concentrated populations of the Anatolian Greek citizens of the Ottoman Empire. As testimony to this, many churches are seen in the region today.

The settlement of Ürgüp, or St. Prokopios – its oldest known name, was founded as a little town with cave houses carved into steep rocks on the valley of Tomisos (today Damsa) stream. The main historical spot is the rock formation also known as Esbelli, the center of settlement in Ürgüp. It is surrounded with dwellings and ruins of other buildings carved into the land or made with local stones, part of which forms Kayakapi Neighbourhood.

=== Transportation and Settlement System ===
Today, lying 17 km east of Nevşehir, Ürgüp is a major tourism center with its naturally carved topographical shapes, underground cities and rock-carved churches. The city is located on the Nevşehir – Kayseri highway and also has a developed transportation system reaching smaller centers such as Avanos, Ortahisar, Uçhisar and Göreme, due to its interactive economical and social relations. There are regular buses, which come to Ürgüp as well as daily / specialized tours, mostly because it is a preferred place by travel agencies. The ring road passing north of the city is partially completed and urban development continues on the east and northeast, towards the plains of Damsa Stream and the hills on the Kayseri road. In the latest planning works (see Background of Project Development), the lack of urban sub-centers is recognized. New regulations have been brought about to slowly move small-scaled industrial areas to the outskirts of the city.

Although as much as 25 hectares of the city were declared tourism areas in the Implementation Plan, due to the excessive amount of financing that is needed, investments could be realized on only half of that area and lately have come to a stopping point. In recent years, visitor accommodation was mainly achieved through small-scaled establishments in dwelling areas.

Kalpaklı Kaya Natural Site, with its spreading boundaries, is within the region where Esbelli Rock is situated and is defined as an important reference point, which can affect the city macro form during planning projects.

Technically, the water and sewage structures are sufficient. There is a treatment plant built and managed by the Ministry of Tourism. Waste products from the houses are processed and are directed to the Damsa Stream.

=== Settlement Fabric and Architectural Features ===
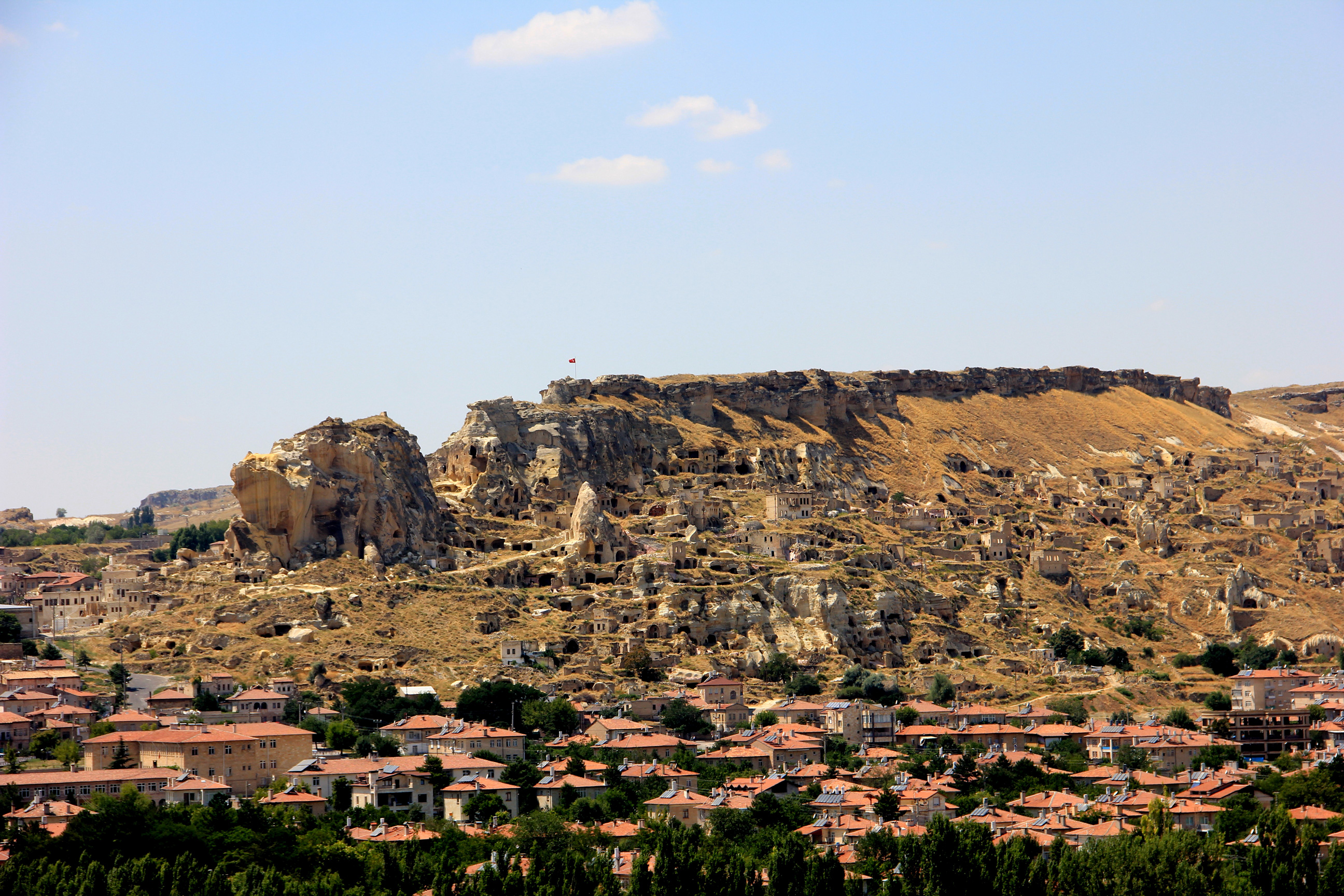
General view over Kayakapi

The Kayakapi Project involves an area of 157 buildings and approximately 23.5 hectares consisting of 255 lots.

The historical Kayakapi Neighbourhood is situated on the northeastern slope of a natural elevation known as Esbelli Rock, which is the most dominant visual and physical feature of the Ürgüp city center. It not only affords an interesting visual spectacle from the point of view of the town, it is also a spot from which a beautiful view of the Cappadocian terrain to the north can be observed. The site comprises many monumental and residential cultural properties – among them, the House of John (Esat Ağa Konağı) – that have become part of the natural topography. John the Russian lived during the late Ottoman times and was regarded as a saint by the local Greeks. The House of John is especially worth mentioning as a place of pilgrimage that is annually visited by the Orthodox Greeks on 27 May. Looking at the settlement history of the city, Kayakapi is thought to be the first settlement area in Ürgüp. It is said that the oldest church of Ürgüp is the rock-carved church in the Kayakapi Neighbourhood. The fact that many of the notable citizens of Ürgüp are natives of this neighbourhood indicates the important contribution of Kayakapi to Ürgüp's urban identity.

After Kayakapi Neighbourhood was deserted, it in time gained an authentic and mysterious character through its half-ruined buildings and naturally evolved landscape. On the other hand, the natural deterioration of the site, as well as human interventions to remove certain architectural elements of the houses, has increased the pace at which the site is being damaged.

== Administrative and Socio-Economic Structure ==
Ürgüp is one of the more economically developed districts of Nevşehir province and as one of the three city centers of the province with a population exceeding 10.000, it has historically had a larger center than Nevşehir. An important part of the population consisted of Anatolian Greeks, before the population exchange between Greece and Turkey in 1923.

Today, the population (14.502 in 2000) consists mostly of young people, with 900 students enrolled in seven primary schools and three high schools, among them a vocational school for girls. The lively cultural and social scene of the city hosts a sizeable library, a city museum and regular festivals including the Cappadocia Film Festival. The Municipality is also a member of the Turkish Association of Historic Towns and Regions and an active follower of the Local Agenda 21, which was adopted in June 1992 during the United Nations Conference on Environment and Development – the global action plan for sustainable development for the 21st century.

After the introduction of tourism in the region in the 1970s, a significant population growth occurred, and the livelihood of the majority of the local people became tourism, along with traditional agricultural activities. Ürgüp is an important destination both for Turkish and foreign tourists, who mostly come for day trips between March and November. Its position within the sector is still improving, with many hotels and pensions in the city, comprising a bed capacity of about 1.000; with the Kayakapi Project, this number is expected to double.

The main economic activities in Ürgüp involve trade based on tourism, marble souvenir workshops, carpet weaving, and agricultural products. Wine, molasses and marmalade are produced from the expanses of vineyards and orchards. Industrial products, which are not very developed, include cement raw material and pumice stone.

== Background of Project Development ==
Following the announcement of a ministerial decree, Ürgüp district was declared a ‘Tourism Development Area’, in 23.2.1973 (no. 7/ 5811). This ushered the period of tourism boom for Cappadocia. More specific planning works undertaken for Ürgüp and environs include a Master Development Plan on 1/5.000 scale and an Implementation Plan on 1/1.000 scale approved in 1976, followed by an Environmental Organization Plan on 1/25.000 scale and an Addition and Revision Plan on 1/1.000 scale approved in 1999. Within these plans, the Kayakapi Neighbourhood carried the status of a ‘natural site’, until recently, thus staying untouched by nearby modern urban development.

The idea to undertake a study in Kayakapi such as the Kayakapi Project started in 2000 after the concern of the municipality of Ürgüp was raised that the area should be conserved and utilized before it eroded any further. Following thorough research and this investigation, Kayakapi was removed from the disaster zone through the evaluation and decision of the Ministry of Public Works and Settlement in December 2000 and was later declared an ‘Urban Site Conservation Area’, by the decision of the Nevşehir Council for the Protection of Cultural and Natural Heritage, dated 10.02.2001/no. 1441.

=== Some Figures Relating to the Site ===
Urban Site Area:	23.5 hectares, 255 lots
Area of expropriation:	11.6 hectares, 213 lots
Areas containing buildings / rock-carved spaces:	3.6 hectares, 157 lots 82 rock-carved; 24 stone masonry; 51 mixed building – space
Open areas not containing buildings / rock-carved spaces:	5.5 hectares, 56 lots 36 vacant lots; 14 fields; 5 orchard / vineyards; 1 rock
Area outside lots (rocky terrain):	2.5 hectares
Cultural assets (as observed presently):	3 unregistered structures 1 rock-carved church, 1 mosque, 1 house, 2 fountains 7 registered structures 1 mosque; 1 bath, 1 house [House of John (Esat Ağa Konağı)], 4 fountains
