= Churches of Göreme =

Archaeological sites in Turkey

Coordinates: 38°40′N 34°50′E

The Dark Church in Göreme, Turkey.

The churches of Göreme, Turkey.

Göreme is a district of the Nevşehir Province in Turkey. After the eruption of Mount Erciyes about 2.6 million years ago, ash and lava formed soft rocks in the Cappadocia region, covering an area of about 20,000 square kilometres (7,700 mi^{2}). The softer rock was eroded by wind and water, leaving the hard cap rock on top of pillars, forming the present-day fairy chimneys. People of Göreme, at the heart of the Cappadocia region, realized that these soft rocks could be easily carved out to form houses, churches, and monasteries. These Christian sanctuaries contain many examples of Byzantine art from the post-iconoclastic period. These frescoes are a unique artistic achievement from this period.

In the 4th century, small anchorite communities began to form in the region, acting on the instruction of Saint Basil of Caesarea. They carved cells in the soft rock. During the iconoclastic period (725–842) the decoration of the many sanctuaries in the region was held to a minimum, usually symbols such as the depiction of the Christian cross. After this period, new churches were dug into the rocks, and they were richly decorated with colourful frescoes. They were in use until the Greco-Turkish population exchange in 1923.

== Tokalı Kilise ==
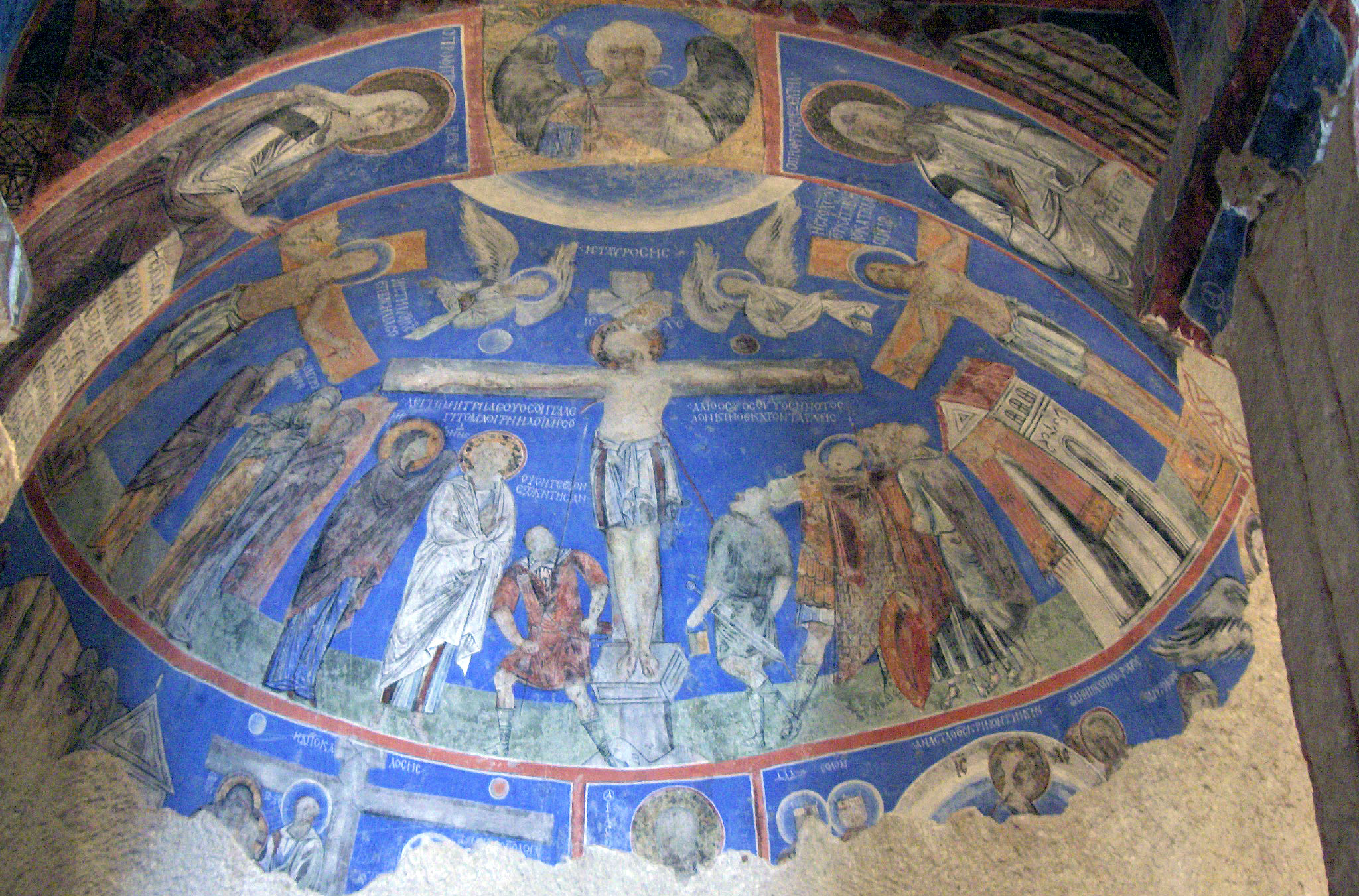
Fresco of the Crucifixion on the apse of Tokalı Kilise

Tokalı Kilise (or the Church of the Buckle), is the largest church in Göreme. Restoration of the church was completed during the 1980s. The only surviving example of its architectural origins is the Church of Mar Yakub in the Tur Abdin region located around present day Mardin.

One noted feature of the church is the main nave containing ninth century frescoes in "provincial" style, the more recent additions are three apses of the 11th-century frescos, which are rendered in "metropolitan" style. The church contains frescos of the twelve apostles, saints and scenes from the life of Jesus. The church also has a crypt underneath the nave.

Tokalı kilise is formed of four chambers: the Old Church, the larger New Church, the side chapel (parekklesion), and the Lower Church. The Old Church dates to the 10th century. It was originally a single-naved barrel-vaulted church. But its apse was destroyed when the New Church was added at the end of the 10th or early 11th century. Now the Old Church provides entrance to the New Church. The Old Church is decorated with pale hues of red and green painted in strips to represent scenes from the New Testament and depictions of some saints.

Panels of rich indigo painted with pigments from Badakshan lapis lazuli stone dominate the New Church: scenes from the New Testament, miracles of Christ, the first deacons, episodes from the life of St. Basil (one of the Cappadocian Fathers), depictions of Leades (one of the Forty Martyrs) and St. Menas. The expense would have been considerable. The value of the lapis lazuli alone is estimated to be around 31.5 pounds of gold. Scholars have speculated as to the identity of the donors, with many suggesting the Phokades, a prominent Cappadocian family. However, there is no convincing evidence to support this.

The New Church was carved out of the eastern wall of the Old Church and decorated with Eastern-style arches and a series of arcades. The Paracclesion, located at the left side of the New Church, is a barrel-vaulted chapel with a single apse. The Lower Church has three aisles and a burial space or krypt.

=== Fresco Decoration of the Old Church at Tokalı Kilise ===
The most elaborate decorative program of the Old Church at Tokalı Kilise is the Christological cycle located in the barrel vault of the one-aisled basilica. On each side of the vault there are three registers of narrative containing 32 scenes depicting the traditional tripartite division of the life of Christ; the Infancy, the Miracles, and the Passion. The spine of the vault is decorated with a row of medallions containing portraits of Old Testament prophets and saints. The narrative begins at the southeast corner of the top register with the Annunciation, it then reads towards the west (left to right), crosses to the other side of the spine of medallions and finishes with the Murder of Zacchariah in the northeast corner to complete the Infancy chapter. The second chapter of Christ's life, the Miracles, occupies the middle of the three registers (or the second register from the top) and also reads left to right, skipping over the spine of medallions. The Miracles begins right after the Infancy ends with the Flight of Elizabeth and ends with the Raising of Lazarus. Lastly the lowest register tells of the Passion and reads in the same manner and direction as the first two registers. It begins with the Entry into Jerusalem and ends with the Descent into Limbo (Anastasis). There are three images related to the narrative of the vault but located outside of it; the Transfiguration in the west tympanum, the Ascension in the eastern tympanum, and Presentation in the Temple located on the south side of the east wall.

Due to its semi-isolated location in the Cappadocian region, the frescos in the Old Church of Tokalı Kilise (as well as many other rock-cut churches in the area) are based on the Gospel of James rather than the canonical Gospels. This difference, from the more metropolitan centers of the empire like Istanbul, accounts for the unusual sequencing of the Christological narrative. For example, typically the Flight of Egypt would be the final scene of the Infancy chapter but in the Old Church two more scenes are included; the Murder of Zacchariah and the Flight of Elizabeth which begins the Miracles chapter. This anomaly occurs because the artist was adhering to the Gospel of James which includes both of these scenes. Although other rock-cut churches in Cappadocia also based their narratives on the Gospel of James, none are exactly like the Old Church at Tokalı Kilise. Only fragments of this Christological cycle narrative were implemented in other churches.

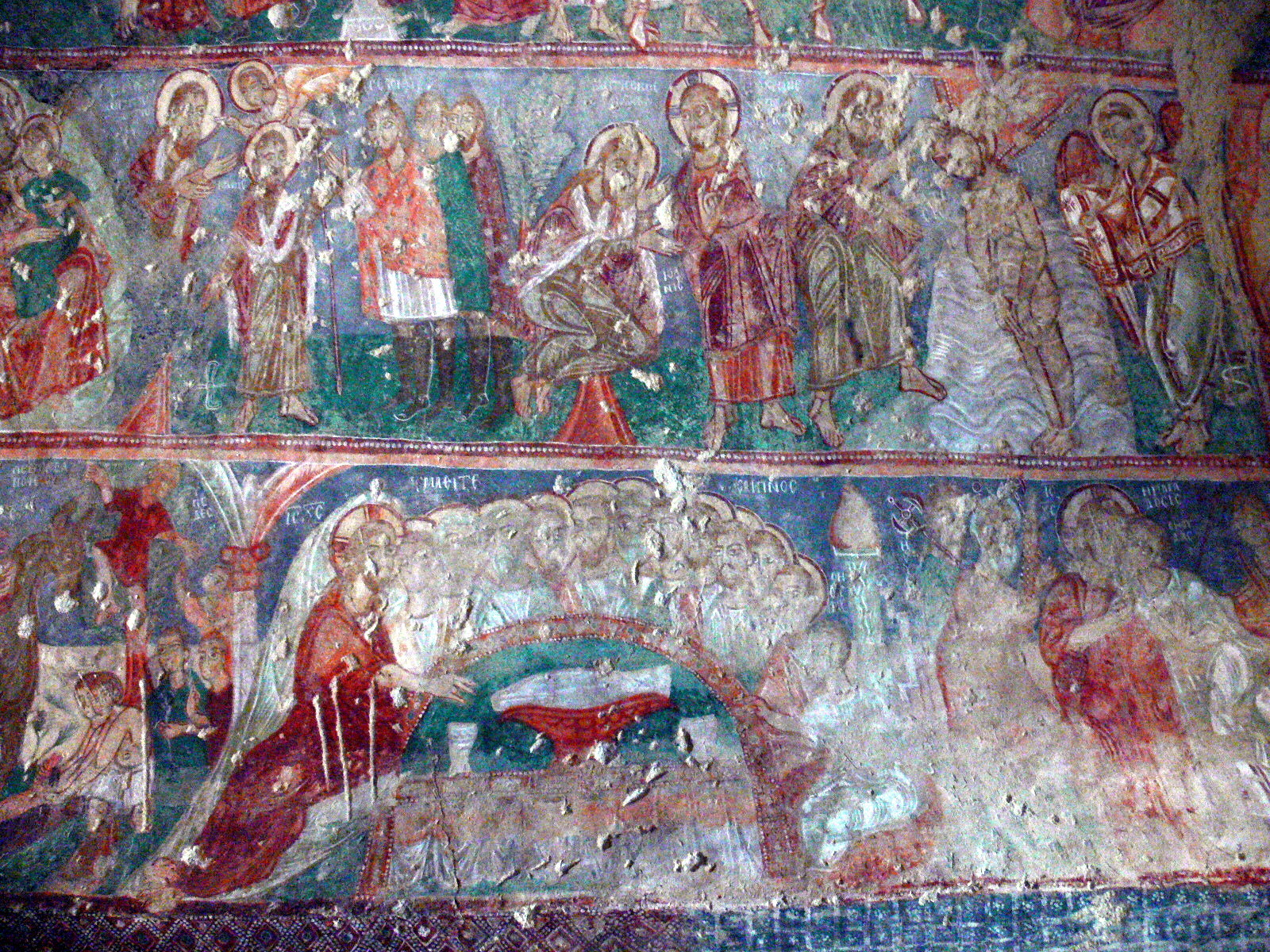
The Last Supper scene in the Christological cycle of the Old Church

The style of the frescos are consistent with other imagery of the period and region. The images do not necessarily render reality; the figures do not display convincing volume and the drapery is unnaturalistic being more concerned with a geometric style of representation. The figures are placed in the front of the picture plane which alludes that the artist(s) were not concerned with realistic depth. These stylistic traits (proportions, flatness and geometric abstraction) can also be compared to frescos in other parts of the empire like Hagia Sophia in Istanbul. However an entirely regional trait is also evident in the "tendency to name otherwise anonymous characters through the association with an object or action in the text (Bible)." An example is the figure filling an urn with water in the Miracle at Cana scene who is named Antlioin which is derived from the Greek word "to draw out".

The composition of the Christological cycle as whole has symbolic meaning. Considering the medallions containing portraits of the Old Testament prophets is located at the highest point of the vault, the spine, it is representing the beginning or the first age of revelation and they are the figures who foretell the coming of Christ and his deeds on earth. These prophecies are then depicted throughout the rest of the narrative in the Infancy, Miracles and Passion registers that fill the remainder of the vault – the second age of revelation. The narrative continues on the eastern tympanum with the Ascension, when Christ's resurrected body is taken to heaven. This is the beginning of his Holy influence and initiates the third age of revelation. The composition of the narrative as a whole reflects the progression of revelation before, during and after Christ's life on earth.

=== Fresco Decoration of the New Church at Tokalı Kilise ===
The New Church at Tokalı Kilise is a much larger church than the Old Church and therefore has much more decoration. There are two main fresco cycles and a large amount of saints, clergymen and martyrs distributed throughout the rest of the wall space. Like in the Old Church, the Christological cycle is the most elaborate and extensive decoration of the New Church. Located in the nave the Infancy, the Miracles and the Passion are depicted in high quality painting. The narrative starts in the north bay of the nave and proceeds in a register above the arcades.

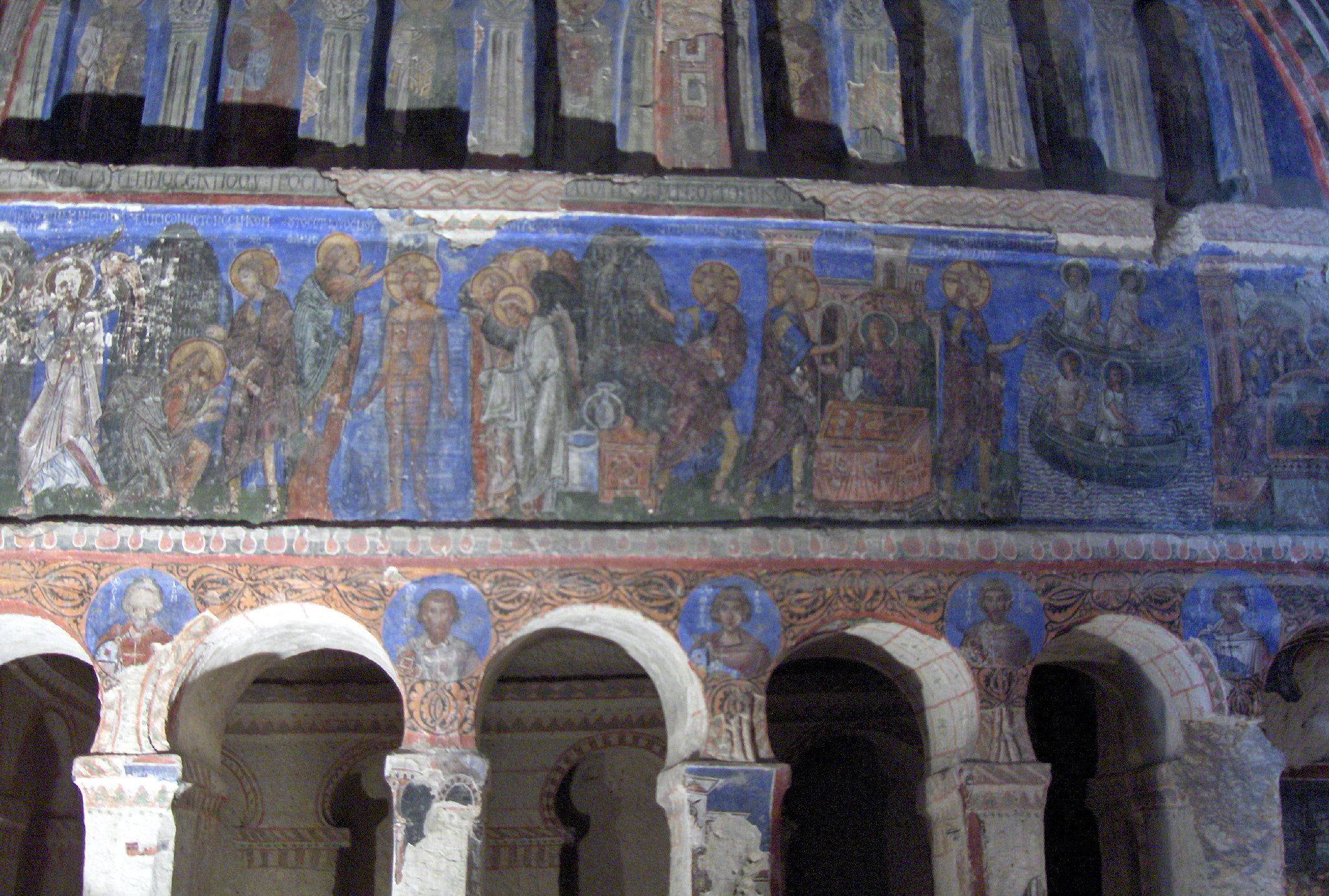
View of the Christological cycle in the New Church

A few important scenes were reserved for more prominent locations; the Ascension, Benediction of Apostles, Pentecost, and Mission of Apostles are located in the center and south bays of the nave vault.

The other major narrative cycle in the New Church at Tokalı Kilise is the life of Saint Basil. St. Basil was the principal religious figure of the Cappadocian region and it is therefore suspected that the New Church was dedicated to him There are only two known fresco cycles of the life of St. Basil, the other located in a chapel in Balkam Deresi (also in Cappadocia). The cycle in the New Church contains scenes from the earlier part of the narrative while the chapel at Balkam Deresi depicts the later scenes. Located in the transept on the lower walls of the north bay multiple scenes from this local Cappadocian saint were painted in the New Church. The scenes include: The Dispute for the Church of Nicaea, Basil and the Emperor Valens, Prayer of the Arians, Prayer of the Orthodox, Meeting of St. Ephraim and St. Basil, Absolution of the Sinful Woman and Funeral of Basil. Accompanying each fresco is an inscription taken directly from the biographical writings of Pseudo-Amphilochio describing the scene.

Unlike majority of the rock-cut churches the patronage of the New Church is surprisingly known. Located on the nave cornice a fragment of sentence was written which translates to: 'Your (most holy church) was completely decorated by Constantine out of love for the monastery (of the heavenly angles). He adorns his new work with twenty venerable images…' (it continues with descriptions of the twenty mentioned scenes). A second inscription located in the north apse is translated as: 'The bema was decorated by … Nikephoros, at the expense of Leon, son of Constantine. You who read (this), pray for them through the Lord. Amen.' Through these two inscriptions it is inferred that the painter was Nikephoros and there were two patrons, Constantine and his son Leon. Neither patron is identified by a title meaning one of two things. Either they were people of minor importance or they were so important and well known that it was unnecessary to include their titles. Considering it would have been very expensive to fund such elaborate fresco decoration it is more likely that they were wealthy and therefore well known, thus no titles were necessary. Stylistically the New Church frescos are similar to paintings of the same time period found in Istanbul which suggests that the patrons may have paid for a workshop to come to Cappadocia specifically to decorate the New Church. This fact also points to wealthy patrons. As for Nikephoros, the artist name mentioned in the second inscription, it should not be assumed that he was the only artist. It is more likely that he was the master of the workshop responsible for the frescos and therefore received the credit for the work. In this scenario Nikephoros would have had multiple apprentices helping him with the many tasks associated with creating frescos. It is also unclear in the second inscription as to exactly what part of the decoration Nikephoros was responsible for. However, with much research and evidence the leading scholar on Tokali Kilise, Ann Wharton Epstein, argues that Nikephoros was responsible for the entire decoration of the New Church.

== Elmalı Kilise ==
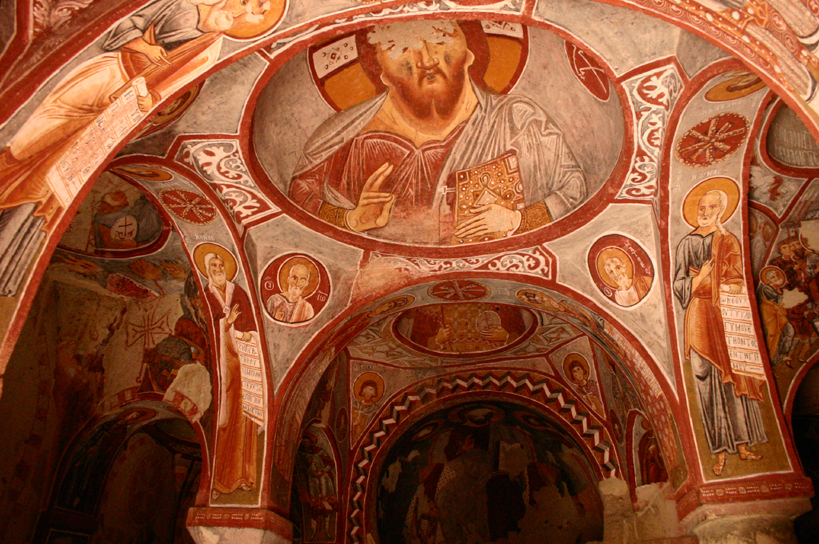
Rock Chapel Goreme (Elmalı Kilise)

Elmalı Kilise (or the Apple Church) a smaller cave church. Was built around 1050 and has carved into four irregular pillars the sign of a Greek cross with these pillars support its central dome. Restoration on the church was completed in 1991, but the frescos continue to chip off, revealing a layer of earlier paintings underneath. The church's paintings depict scenes of the saints, bishops, and martyrs. and to the right of the altar, a Last Supper with the symbolic fish (the letters of the word fish in Greek, ΙΧΘΥΣ, stand for "Jesus Christ, Son of God, the Savior"). The name of the church is believed to refer to a reddish orb in the left hand of the Archangel Michael in the dome of the main apse, or possibly to an apple tree that grew in the vicinity.

== Azize Barbara Kilisesi ==
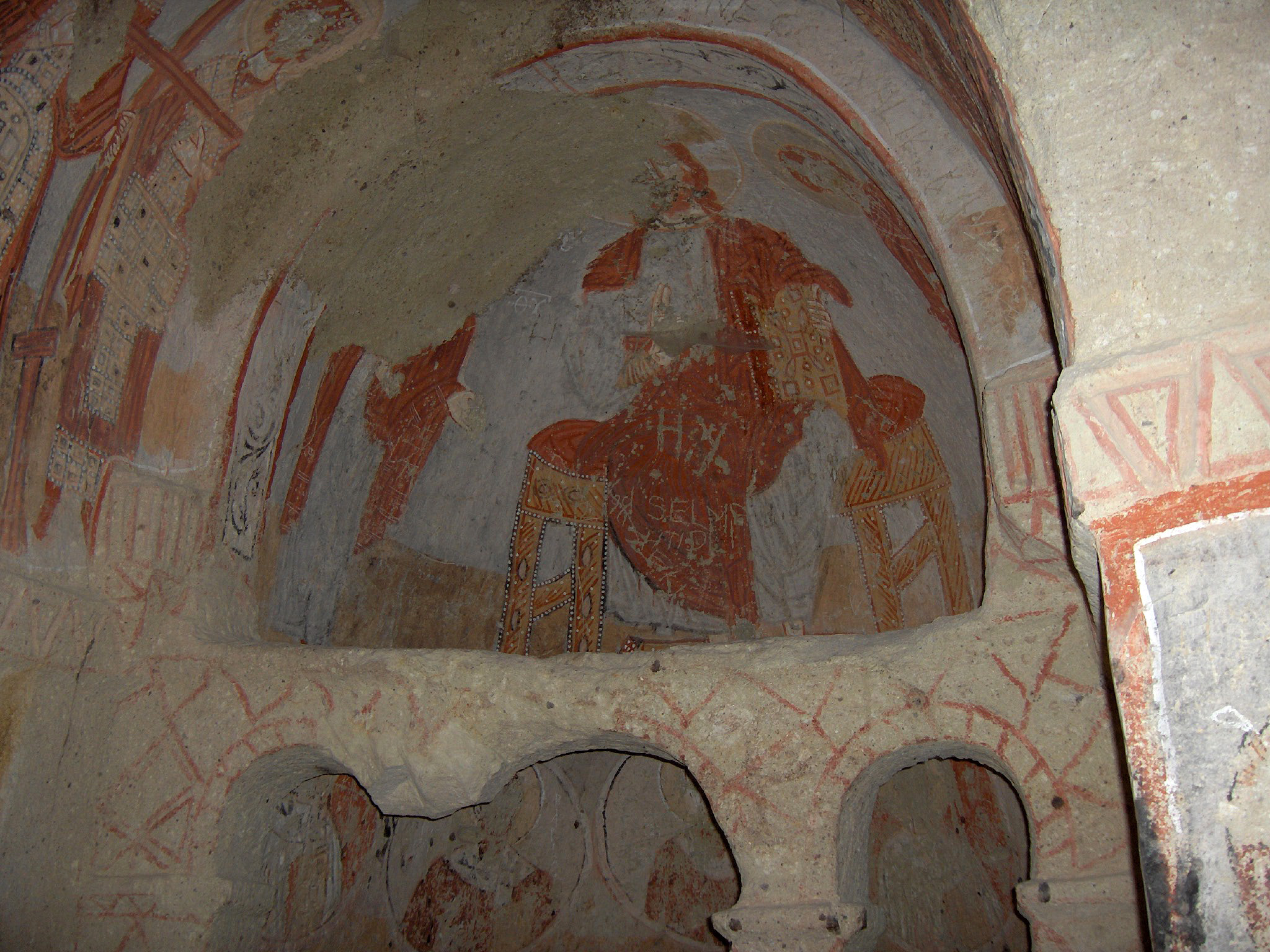
Fresco of Christ Pantocrator in Azize Barbara Kilisesi

Azize Barbara Kilisesi, (or the Church of Saint Barbara) Barbara was a Greek martyr who was imprisoned by her father in order to protect her from the influences of Christianity. Barbara nevertheless found a way to practice her faith and her father tortured and killed her.

Built in the late 11th Century, the church was possibly built as a tribute to the Martyr-Saint. The church has the same layout as Çarikli Kilise. The church has a cross-dome with one central apse, two side apses and two columns. The dome depicts Christ on the Throne, with geometrical patterns painted in red ochre, painted directly on the rock, believed to be symbolic in nature. Another fresco with the large locust possibly representing evil, which is warded off by the protection of two adjacent crosses. The north wall of the church contains a fresco of St. George and St Theodore on horse-back struggling against the dragon and snake. The monks drew red ochre lines on the rocks, to give the impression that cut stones were used in the construction.

== Yılanlı Kilise ==
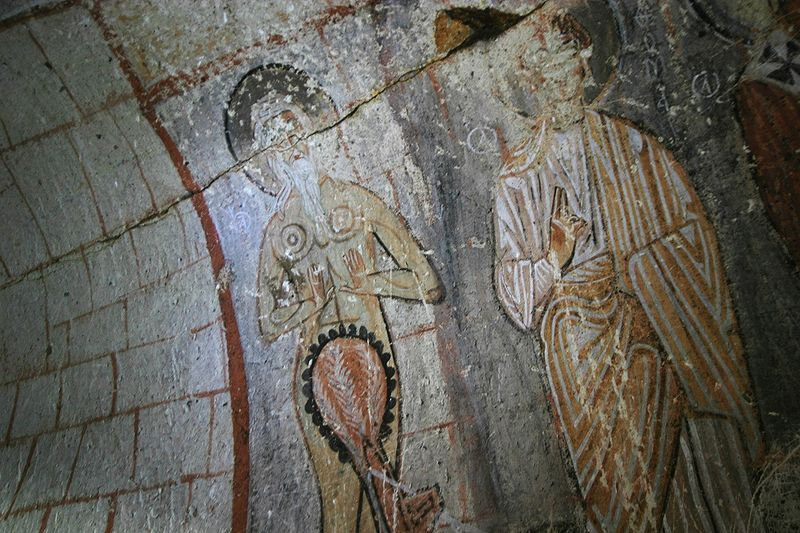
Fresco of Onuphrius (on left)

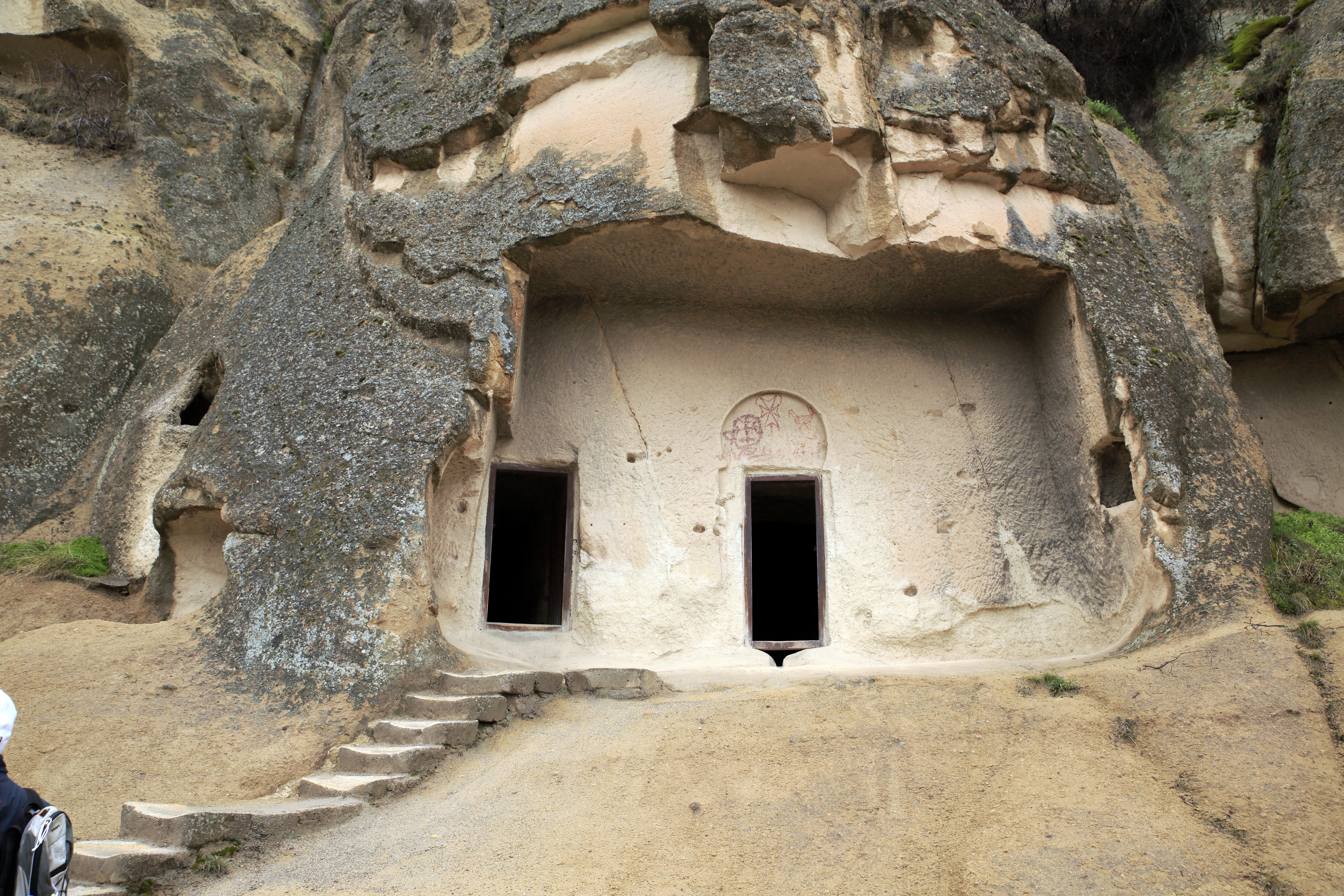
Exterior of the Yılanlı Kilise in Göreme

Yılanlı Kilise (the Snake Church) is a simple barrel-vaulted church with a low ceiling and long nave. It is named for the fresco of Saints Theodore and St George slaying the dragon (or snake as depicted in the fresco). The church also has a fresco of Emperor Constantine and his mother Helena depicted holding the True Cross. Legend has it that she discovered the cross upon which Jesus was crucified after seeing it in a dream, and that a piece of the cross is still buried in the foundations of the Hagia Sophia in Istanbul. Other sections of the cross are in the Church of the Holy Sepulchre and in St. Peter's in Rome. Another interesting portrait is the one of Saint Onuphrius on the upper wall to the right of the entrance. The saint lived the life of a hermit in the Egyptian desert near Thebes, Egypt and is usually depicted with a long gray beard and wearing only a fig leaf.

== Karanlık Kilise ==
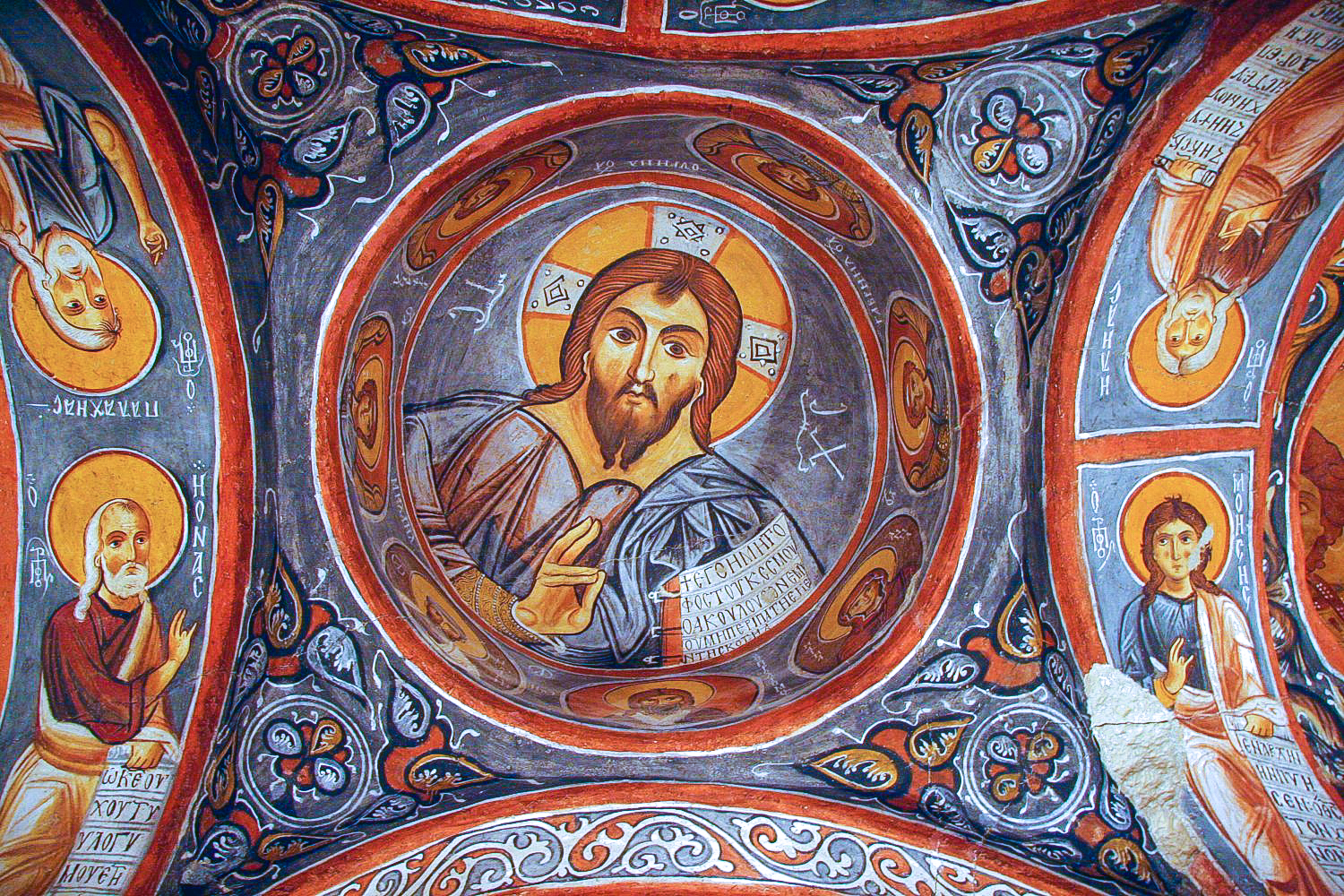
Fresco of Christ Pantocrator on the ceiling of Karanlık Kilise

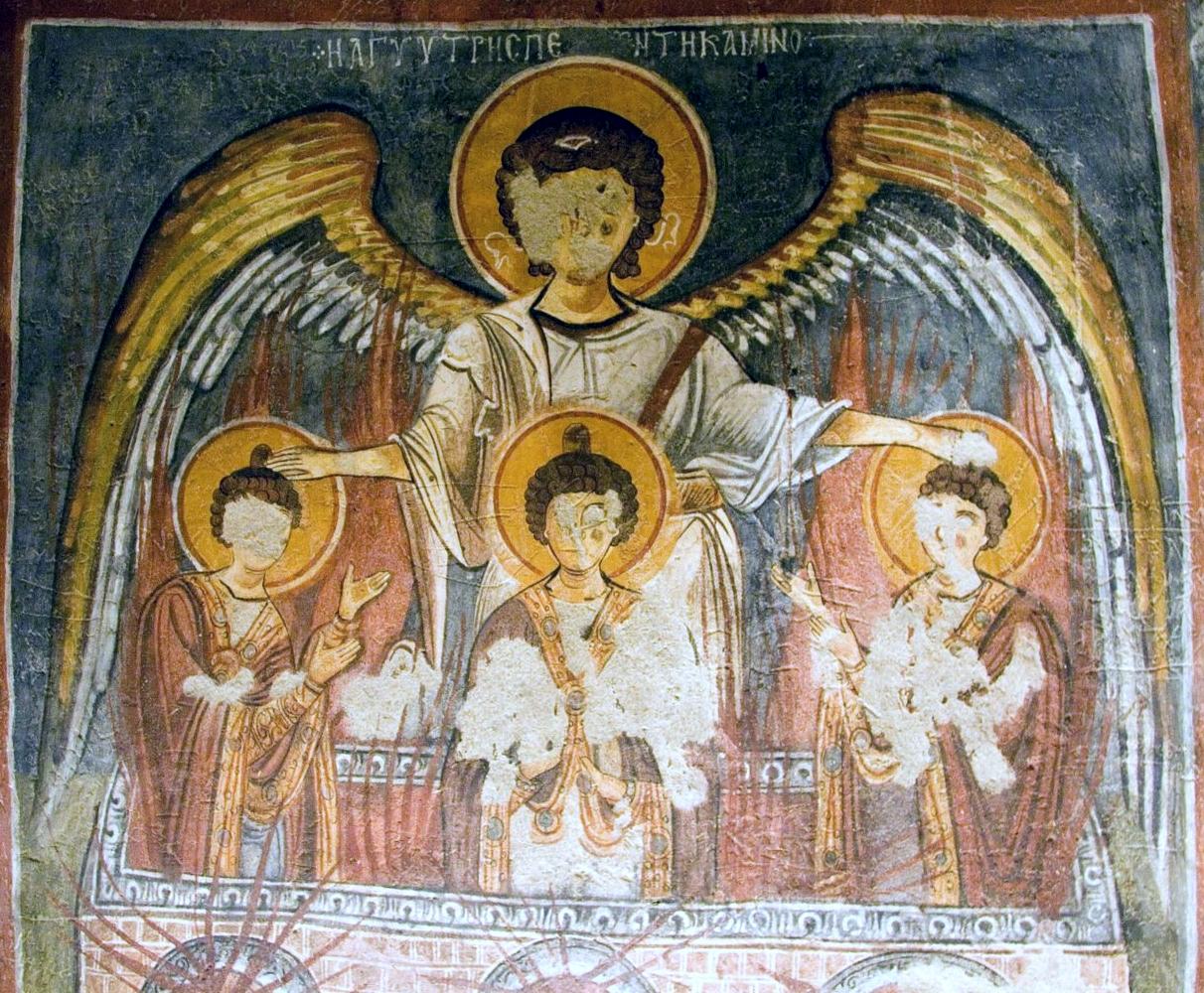
Fresco of the archangel Michael protecting Hananiah, Mishael, and Azariah in the fiery furnace

Karanlık Kilise (or the Dark Church) was a monastic compound built in the 11th century. It is a domed church with one main apse, two small apses and four columns. It was decorated with scenes from the New Testament: Christ Pantocrator, Nativity, Adoration of the Magi, First Bath, Last Supper, Betrayal of Judas, Crucifixion, Anastasis.

After the Turkish invasion it was used as a pigeon house until the 1950s. After 14 years of scraping pigeon droppings off the walls, these newly restored frescos, depicting scenes from the New Testament, are the best preserved in all of Cappadocia and a fine example of 11th-century Byzantine art. Part of the narthex or vestibule however collapsed opening part of the church's roof to the sky. This caused damage to the fresco with Christ's Ascension and the Benediction of the Saints, whereas the other scenes only partially remain where the wall collapsed. The church's name possibly comes from a small oculus looking out of the narthex which only lets in a very small amount of light. This feature is what has preserved the richness of the pigments and allowed them to survive the passage of time.

== Çarıklı Kilise ==
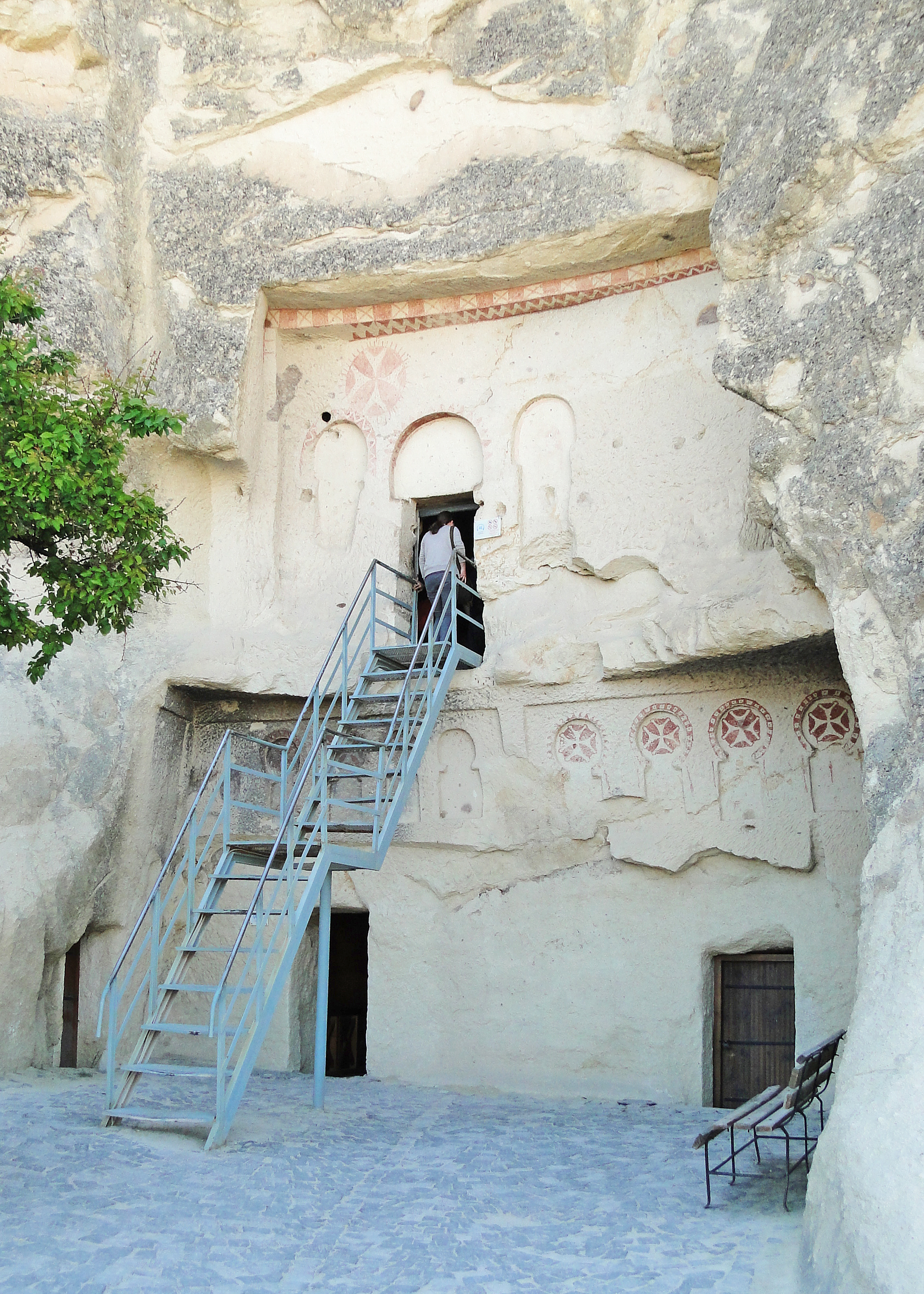
Çarıklı Kilise

Çarıklı Kilise (the Church with Sandals) the name comes from the two footprints at the bottom of the Ascension fresco at the church's entrance (this fresco is said to be an exact copy of the one contained at the Church of the Ascension in Jerusalem). The church is cut into the same rock as Karanlik Kilise. The footprints themselves, have many unconfirmable legends attached to them. The church is carved into a cross floor plan with intersecting vaults. The church's frescos, which date to the 11th century, contain the four Evangelists, the Nativity and the Crucifixion, the Baptism, the Adoration of the Magi, and other New Testament themes.

== List of all the churches ==
=== Göreme (including Open-Air Park) ===
- Dark Church (Karanlık Kilise), (Pantocrator Church)
- Tokalı Kilise (Church of the Buckle)
- Sandals (Çarıklı) Church
- Apple (Elmalı) Church
- El Nazar Church
- Kizlar Monastery, “The nunnery”
- Yusuf Koç Church, (St. Theodorus Church)
- Saklı (Hidden) Church, St. Aya Lonnes Church.
- Ayvalı Monastery, formerly ('St. John's Church') also known as St. loannes, 'San Giovanni' church.
- Direkli Kilise, located in Göreme Historical National Park
- St. Basil Church (Chapel of St. Basil)
- St. Barbara Church (St. Barbara Chapel)
- St. Catherine Church (St. Katherine Chapel)
- St. Onuphrius Church (Yılanlı Kilise)
- Kılıçlar Kilise (Virgin Mary Church)
- Pantocrator Church
- Üzümlü Kilise (Chapel of St. Stylite Nichitas) located in the Red Valley
- St. Agentangeus Church (Üç Haçlı Kilise), located in the Red Valley
- Haçlı Kilise ('Crusader Church') St. Aganthangelus Church
- Aynalı Kilise, ('Mirrored Church'), dedicated to Theotokos, also known as Hagios Georgeos loannes Church.

=== Other churches ===
- St. Sergios Church
- St. Hieron's Tomb (Mausoleum Chapel)
- St. Eustathios Church
- St. Simeon Church near Çavuşin, Pasabagi.
- St. John the Baptist Chapel (Hagios Ioannes Prodromos), Çavuşin
- Çavuşin Church, Nikephoros II Phokas Church.
- Keşlik Monastery, known as Archangelos Monastery (St. Michael and St. Stephen Churches) located in Ürgüp
- Ali Reis (St. Nino) Church, located in Ortahisar
- Church of St. Theodore (Pancarlık Kilisesi), located in between Ortahisar and Ürgüp
- Zindan Church, located in Ortahisar.
- Constantine - Helena Church (Konstantin - Eleni Kilisesi), located in Mustafapaşa
- Aios Vasilios Church, located in Mustafapaşa
- St. Nicholas Monastery Church and St. Stephanos Church, Mustafapaşa
- Kalaşa Mevkii Church, St. Eustace Church, Mustafapaşa
- Church of Timios Stavros, or Church of the Holy Cross, also known as Alakara Kilise, or Tarihi Kilise in Mustafapaşa.
- St. George Church, Mustafapaşa
- St. Joachim and St. Anne Church, Kizilçukur valley
- St. Paul Church
- Kolonlu Kilise
- St. Daniel Chapel
- Cemalların Kilise
- Gıdıların Kilise
- Kadir Durmuş church located near Uçhisar
- Geyikli Church ('Deer church').
- Balikli Church ('Fish church').
- Canbazli, also known as Cambazlı Church
- Harım Kilise
- Sarıca Kilise
- Tavşanlı Kilise
- Ala (Alaca) Kilise
- Kepez Kilise
- Sarnıç Kilise ('Column church')
- Karabulut Church ('Dark cloud').
- St. Theodore Church, located in Yeşilöz, Ürgüp

== See also ==
- Ihlara Valley
- Soğanlı Valley
- Ihlara
- Cappadocia
- Rock-cut architecture of Cappadocia
- Christianity in Turkey
- Derinkuyu Underground City
- Kaymaklı Underground City
- Demre
- Ephesus
- Kuştul Monastery
- Last House of the Virgin Mary
- Mokissos
- Monastery of Mardin
- Sümela Monastery
- Underground cities in Avanos
- Ancient Roman and Byzantine domes
