= Üzümlü Church =

Church building in Nevşehir Province, Turkey

Üzümlü Church (Turkish: Üzümlü Kilisesi) is a 7th-century church located in the Zelve Valley in Central Anatolia. The church itself is classified as a "fairy chimney formation". This church is considered one of the most important historic churches in Zelve, along with Balıklı Kilise and Haçlı Kilise. It is located in Cappadocia's Red Valley, near the town of Ortahisar. The walls of the church are decorated with red and green painted grapevines and a cross is carved into the ceiling. Located nearby is the Valley of the Monks (known as Paşabağ or Rahipler vadisi in Turkish) which is full of distinctive fairy chimney rock formations.
