= Mustafa Güzelgöz =

Turkish librarian (1921–2005)

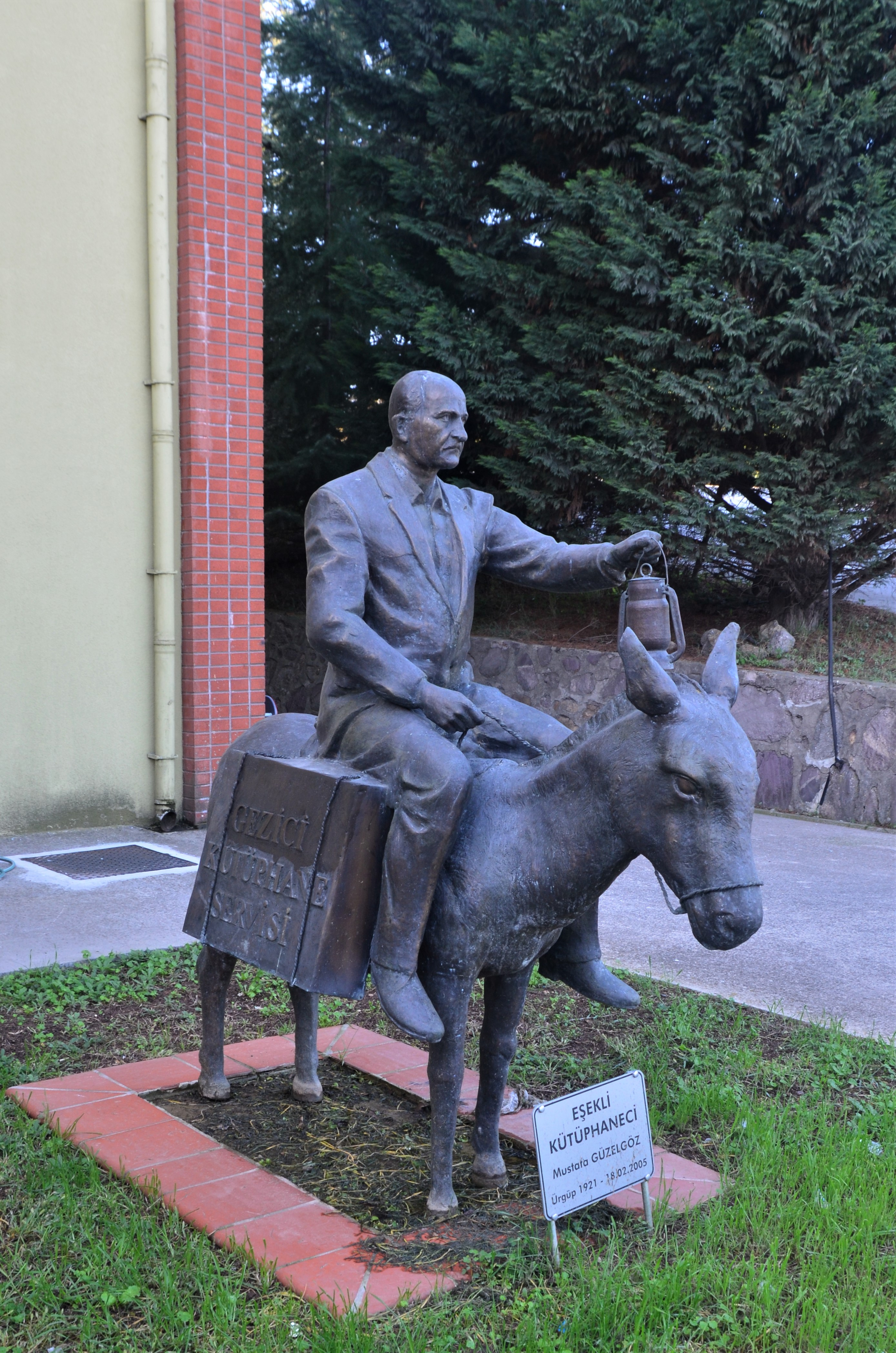
- Statue of Mustafa Güzelgöz, the "Librarian with the Donkey", at the Marmara campus of Maltepe University, Istanbul
- Born: 1921; Ürgüp, Nevşehir Province, Turkey
- Died: 18 February 2005 (aged 83–84); Nevşehir, Turkey
- Occupation: Librarian
- Years active: 1946–1972
- Known for: Establishing and running a traveling library via donkey

Mustafa Güzelgöz (1921 – 18 February 2005) was a Turkish librarian. He established and operated a travelling library which circulated among 36 villages in the Ürgüp district, becoming known as the "Librarian with the Donkey" (Turkish: Eşekli kütüphaneci). By the time of his retirement, he had also established 12 permanent libraries, as well as innovated cultural activities such as sewing and carpentry courses, folk dances, choir and musical concerts, cinema screenings, photography works, sports organisations and a village newspaper.

== Early years ==
Mustafa Güzelgöz was born in a village of the Ürgüp district of Nevşehir province of Central Anatolia in 1921. He sought work in Istanbul and was conscripted into the army in 1940, serving three and half years in the military during World War II. He returned to his hometown in 1944 and was initially unemployed. Then while playing in a football match, he attracted the attention of the district governor (Turkish: Kaymakam) who appointed the 23-year-old as a caretaker at the Tahsin Ağa Library in Ürgüp, a post that had become vacant due to the retirement of an official.

== Librarian career ==
Güzelgöz envisaged his position as being that of a librarian rather than a caretaker of the defunct library. He recovered books from moist and dusty stores, and wrote letters asking for book donations. Despite his success in establishing a library, it attracted little attention so he decided that "If the people do not come to the library, the library has to go to them" and created a traveling library to take books directly to readers. This mobile library serviced people in many villages of Ürgüp, with the book stock carried in wooden crates on the back of a donkey. The two crates, labeled Kitap İare Sandığı (Crate of Books on Loan), could carry 180 to 200 books. An official request for the two assistants and a budget for donkey fodder was accepted by the governor on condition that he would service at least five villages with the library. The formal library building in Ürgüp was only open on weekdays; at weekends Güzelgöz went out to the villages with his traveling library.

He continued with his work despite being mocked and nicknamed "Mustafa the Librarian with the Donkey". Books were loaned out for two weeks then returned for another book when Güzelgöz next visited the same village. He ran the library with three donkeys, three mules and two horses, and serviced a total of 36 villages.

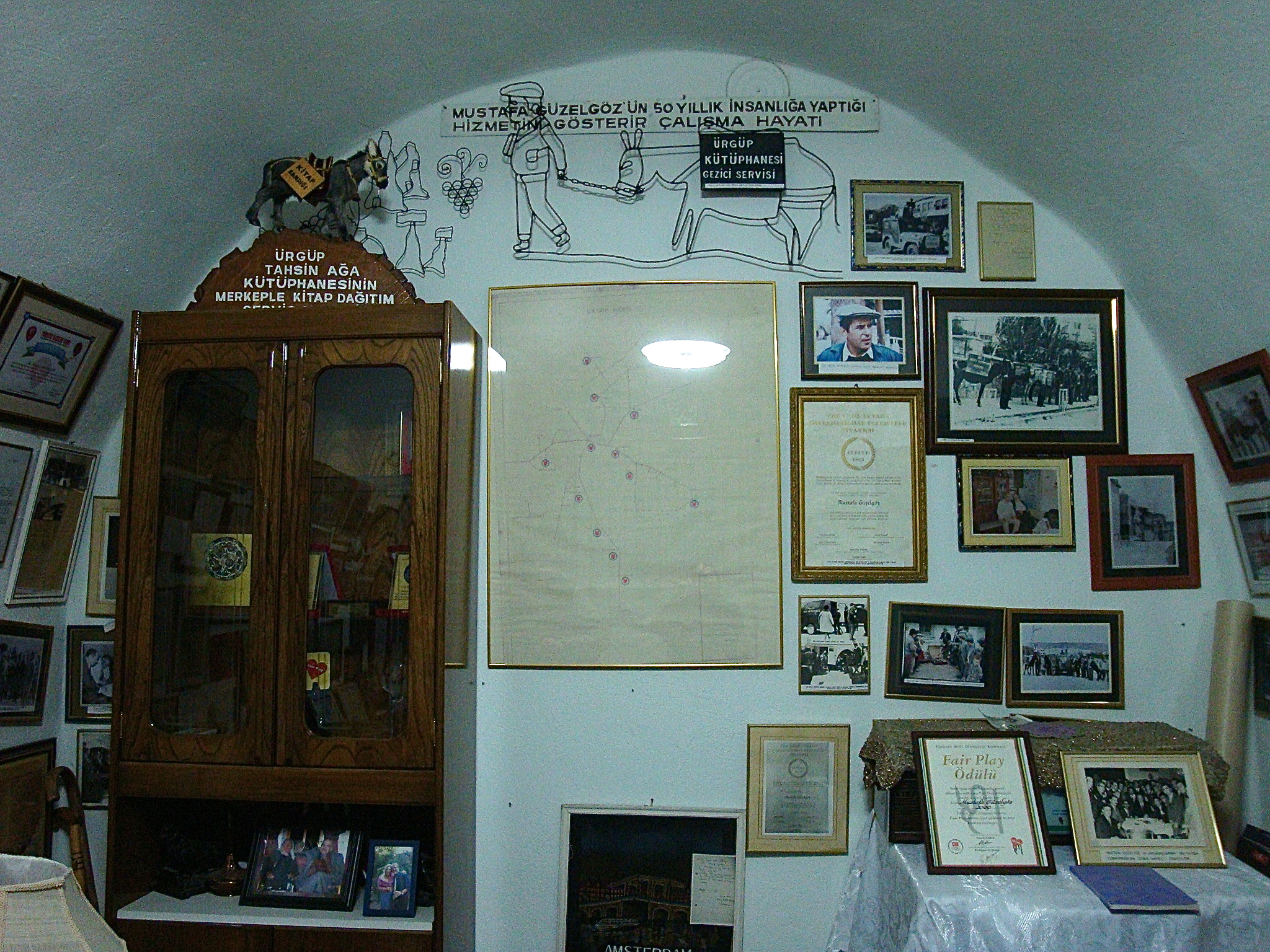
Interior of Mustafa Güzelgöz's house in Ürgüp

After a while he realised that the only readers were, partly because his visit was announced in the village cafes which were men-only zones. To attract women's attention, Güzelgöz asked two world-leading sewing machine manufacturers for a donation in exchange for advertising their brands then installed one Singer and nine Zenith sewing machines in the library building. He offered books on sewing, embroidery, fashion, cooking, and childcare to female villagers, who came to the library to use the machines. His efforts began to see results as villagers developed a habit of reading and their book choices improved. In one village, people even started to read classic books by Honoré de Balzac.

== Social activities ==
Güzelgöz also pioneered many cultural innovations in the region. He organised sewing and carpentry courses in the library building and, for people who were illiterate, he gave literacy courses in the Halkevi community centre. He also initiated folk dances, choirs and concerts, cinema screenings, photography works, sports organisations and a village newspaper. In 1963 the daily newspaper Ulus reported on the billboard newspaper initiated by Güzelgöz in one village.

== Awards and honours ==
In 1963, the American Peace Corps Volunteers Association honoured Güzelgöz with the "Service to Humanity Award", which was bestowed on him by U.S. President John F. Kennedy. The Peace Corps donated a 1960-make Willy's Jeep for use in the traveling library. The same year, Güzelgöz received the service award of "The Lane Bryant Internatıonal Volunteer Citation" from the U.S.

In 1967, the United States Ambassador to Turkey Parker T. Hart met Güzelgöz during his visit to Ürgüp, and donated a pickup truck to the library.

Güzelgöz's life story was fictionalised in a book titled Eşekli Kütüphaneci (The Donkey Librarian) by Fakir Baykurt.

In 2012, a statue of Güzelgöz, created by Eray Okkan, was erected in front of the Faculty of Education, Science and Letters building on the Marmara campus of Maltepe University in Istanbul.

== Later years ==
Güzelgöz was forced to retire in 1972 at the age of 50 after a governmental investigation which accused him of carrying out activities unrelated to his job and neglecting his official work. He left 12 libraries and a collection of around 15,000 books. During a visit to a library in Istanbul, he met the government inspector who had prepared the negative investigation report on him. The inspector told him that "he was forced under pressure to do so".

Güzelgöz died from heart failure on 18 February 2005 in the Nevşehir State Hospital, where he had been treated.
