= John the Russian =

Saint venerated in Eastern Orthodoxy

Saint John the Russian
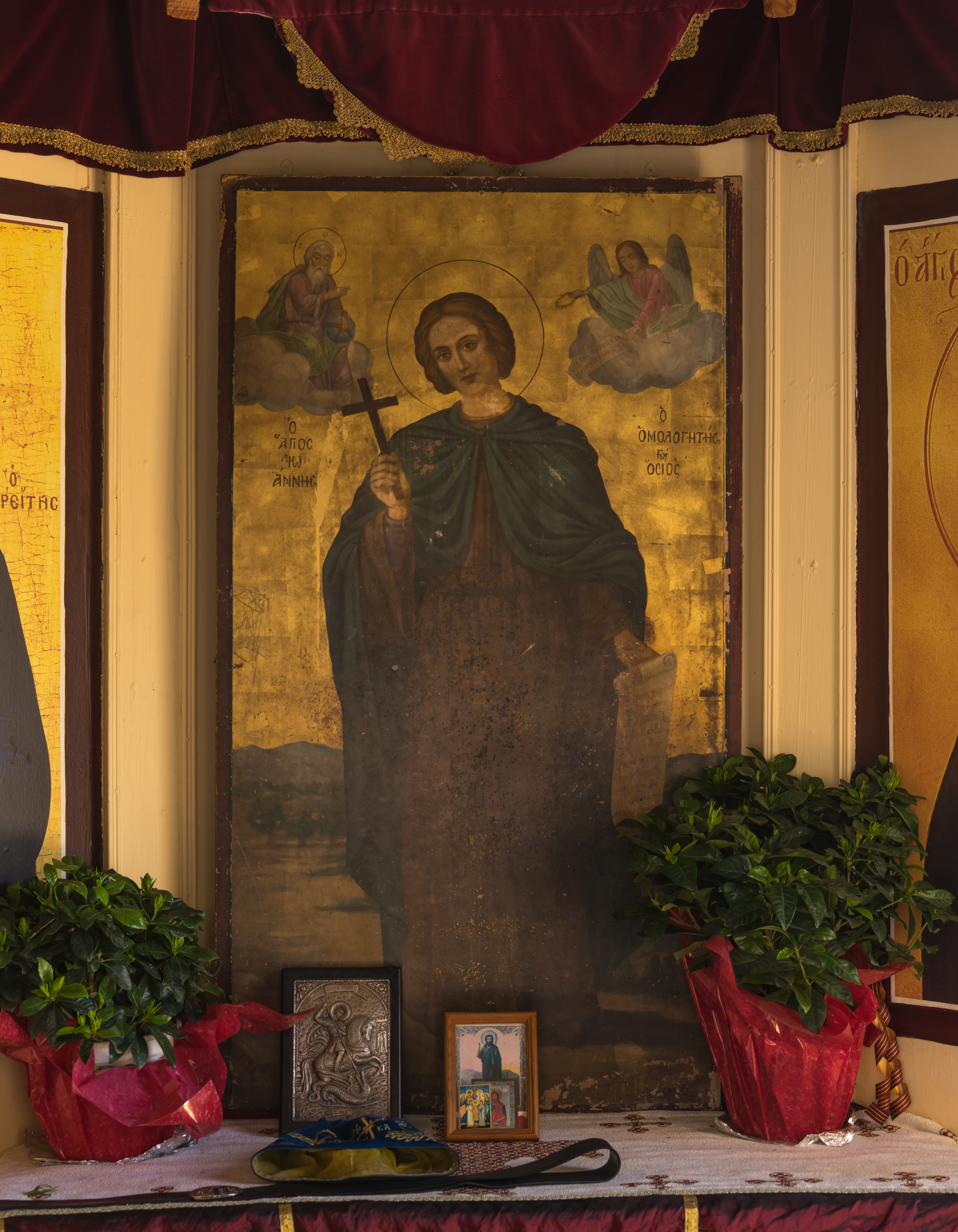
- Icon of St. John in Prokopi, Euboea, Greece, where his relics are located

Righteous, Confessor of the Faith
- Born: c. 1690; Cossack Hetmanate, Russian Tsardom
- Died: 9 June 1730; Ürgüp, Ottoman Empire
- Venerated in: Eastern Orthodox Church, Eastern Catholic Churches
- Major shrine: Church of Saint John the Russian in Prokopi, Euboea, Greece
- Feast: 9 June [O.S. 27 May]
- Patronage: Sick children, cancer patients

John the Russian (Russian: Иоанн Русский; c. 1690 – 9 June [O.S. 27 May] 1730) was a Russian Orthodox slave who is venerated as a saint in the Eastern Orthodox Church. Being a prisoner of war and a slave to a Turkish Ağa, he became famous and respected even by his Muslim master for his humility, steadiness in faith and benevolence. His holy relics are claimed to be incorrupt and wonderworking; there are traditions that this saint particularly helps sick children and those who suffer from cancer.

== Life ==
=== Early life and military service ===
John the Russian was born around 1690 in the Cossack Hetmanate, in the Russian Tsardom. Having come of age, he was recruited in the army of Peter the Great and took part in the Russo-Turkish War (1710–1711). During the war, he was taken prisoner and sold as a slave to the head of the Ottoman cavalry who lived in Ürgüp in Cappadocia (modern-day central Turkey).

=== Life in slavery ===
Because he refused to convert to Islam, John was humiliated and tormented by the Ottoman Turks, who called him a gavur (unbeliever). But as time passed, the mockery stopped because of John's steadiness of faith, humility and diligence and eventually John won the respect of his master and his household. He worked as a groom and lived in the stables. Other slaves mocked him for working zealously but he didn't take offence, trying instead to help and comfort them in their need. For his kind-heartedness, John earned the love and trust of the Ağa who offered to let him live as a free man in a separate house. However, John refused, saying: "My patron is Lord, and no one is above Him. He predestined me to live as a slave in a foreign land; seems, it must be so for my salvation".

During the day John worked and prayed, keeping a strict fast, but when the night came, he used to go in secret to the cave-church of St. George, where he said the prayers of the All-Night Vigil. Every Saturday he used to take Holy Communion.

Soon the Ağa became one of the most influential people in Ürgüp and thought it due to the holy man who lived in his home. Having become rich, the Ağa decided to perform the Hajj. whilst he was away, his wife threw a dinner for relatives and friends. When the master's favourite dish, pilau was being served, she said to John, who was serving as a waiter: "How glad would your master be, if he could eat this pilau with us". John asked her to give him the dish, promising to send it to Mecca. Everybody laughed thinking that John wanted to eat the rice himself or give it away to the poor.

When the Ağa returned, he described a miracle that had happened to him: whilst in Mecca, he found a steaming plate of pilau in his locked room. And his name was engraved on this plate - as it was on every plate in his home.

=== Beginning of veneration ===
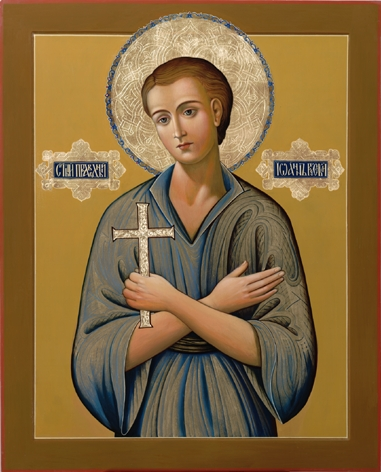
Icon of Saint John the Russian

News of this miracle spread quickly, and everyone, even Muslims, began to call John a Wali—a saint in Islamic thought. However, he did not change the way he lived, and passed his time working hard and praying. Before his death, he became seriously ill and, being unable to stand up, asked a priest to give him Holy Communion. The priest was afraid to be seen going to a Muslim house and hid the Eucharist inside an apple. John the Russian died on 9 June [O.S. 27 May] 1730, some time after receiving Holy Communion.

He was buried in the church of St. George in Prokopio in Cappadocia (now Ürgüp), and was revered as a saint. When the Greeks were expelled from Turkey in 1924, the people took his relics to their new home on the island of Euboea.

== Legacy ==
The relics of John were interred in the Church of St. John the Russian in Prokopi in Euboea, Greece. His right hand is in the Russian Monastery of St Panteleimon on Mount Athos. With the blessing of Patriarch Alexy II of Moscow in 2003–2004, a small wooden church called the Church of Righteous John the Russian was erected in Moscow, in Kuntsevo district, a larger stone one was built nearby later and consecrated in 2016. In Novosibirsk, Russia the lower side chapel of the church of Our Lady of the Sign is also devoted to St. John. There is also a small eukterion dedicated to him in Viljakkala, Ylöjärvi municipality in Finland.
