= Ürgüp District =

District of Nevşehir Province, Turkey

- District
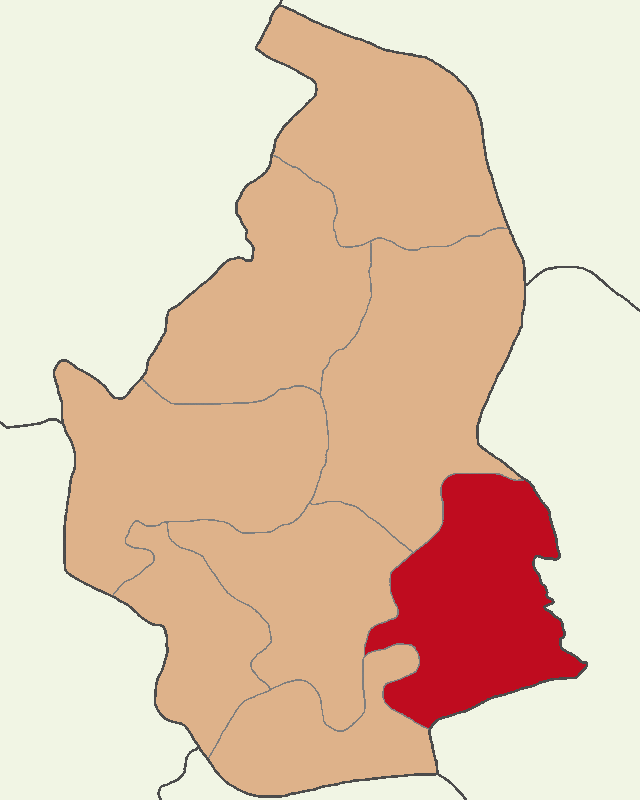
- Map showing Ürgüp District in Nevşehir Province

- Location in Turkey Ürgüp District (Turkey Central Anatolia)
- Coordinates: 38°38′N 34°55′E
- Country: Turkey
- Province: Nevşehir
- Seat: Ürgüp

Government
  - Kaymakam: Cüneyt Caner
- Area: 587 km^{2} (227 sq mi)
- Population (2022): 36,695
  - Density: 63/km^{2} (160/sq mi)
- Time zone: UTC+3 (TRT)
- Website: www.urgup.gov.tr

Ürgüp District is a district of the Nevşehir Province of Turkey. Its seat is the town of Ürgüp. Its area is 587 km^{2}, and its population is 36,695 (2022).

It was a district centre in Niğde Province between 1920 and 1935 and then in Kayseri Province between 1935 and 1954

== Composition ==
There are two municipalities in Ürgüp District:

- Ortahisar
- Ürgüp

There are 23 villages in Ürgüp District:

- Akçaören
- Akköy
- Ayvalı
- Bahçeli
- Başdere
- Boyalı
- Cemil
- Çökek
- Demirtaş
- İbrahimpaşa
- İltaş
- Karacaören
- Karain
- Karakaya
- Karlık
- Mazı
- Mustafapaşa
- Şahinefendi
- Sarıhıdır
- Sofular
- Taşkınpaşa
- Ulaşlı
- Yeşilöz
