= Ürgüp =

- Municipality
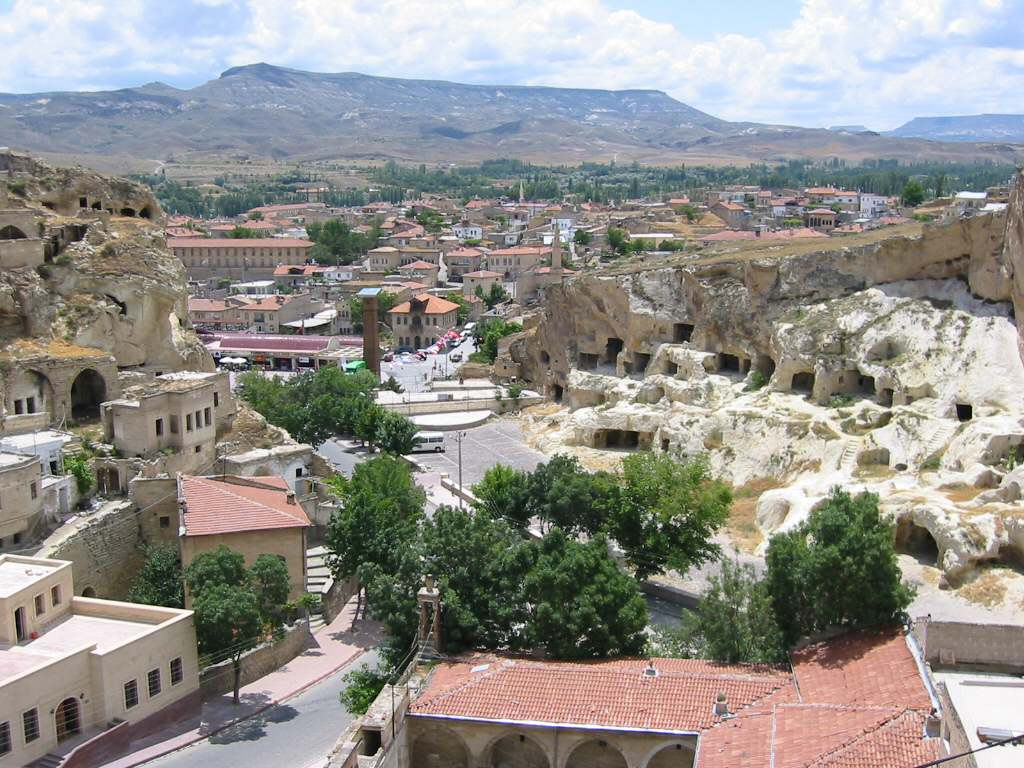
- Hotels built inside cave-houses in Ürgüp

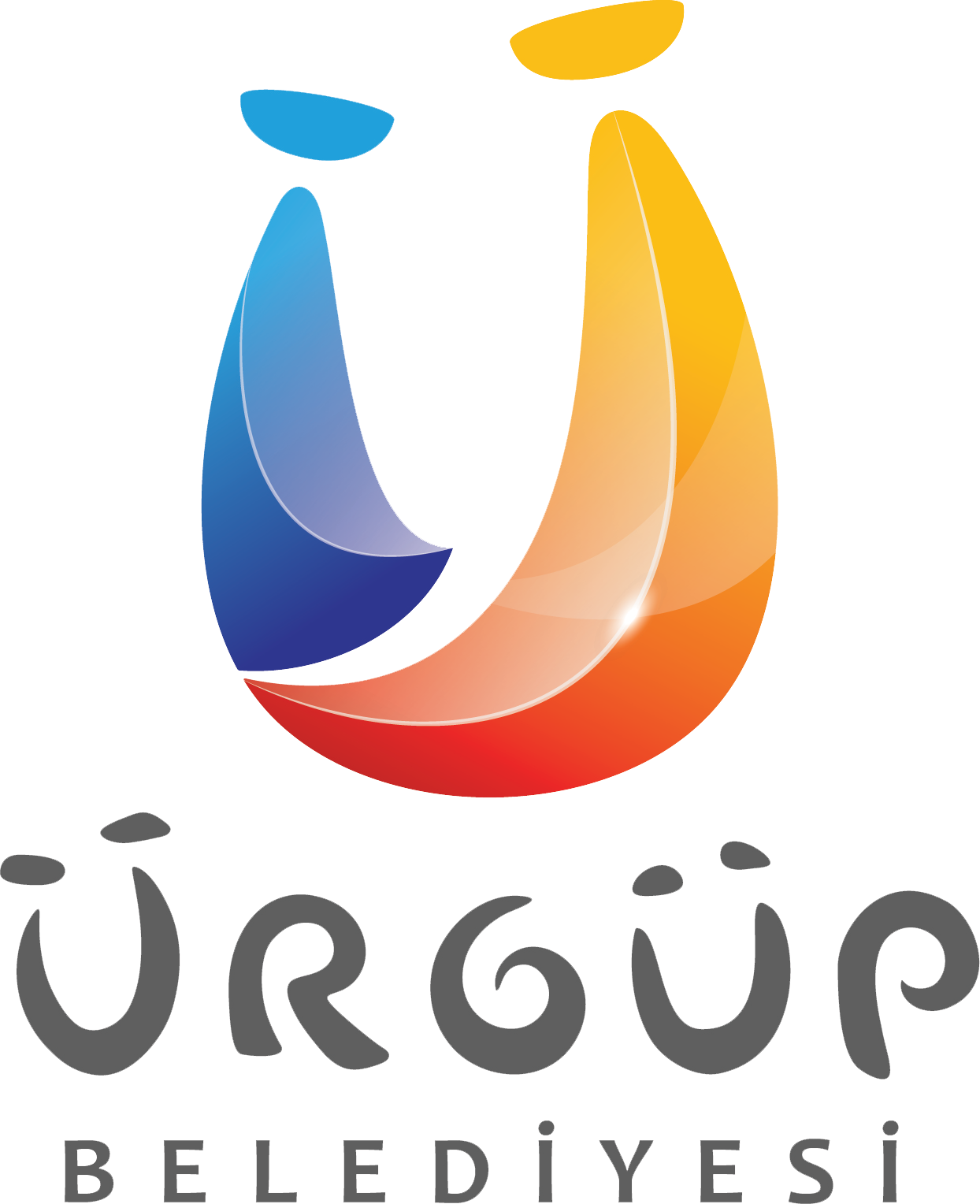
- Logo

- Location within Turkey Location within Turkey Central Anatolia
- Coordinates: 38°37′53″N 34°54′47″E
- Country: Turkey
- Province: Nevşehir
- District: Ürgüp

Government
  - Mayor: Ali Ertuğrul Bul (CHP)
- Elevation: 1,044 m (3,425 ft)
- Population (2022): 24,647
- Time zone: UTC+3 (TRT)
- Postal code: 50400
- Area code: 0384
- Climate: Csb
- Website: www.urgup.bel.tr

Ürgüp (Greek: Προκόπιο Prokópio, Cappadocian Greek: Προκόπι Prokópi, Ottoman Turkish: Burgut Kalesi) is a town in Nevşehir province in the Cappadocia area of Central Anatolia, Turkey. It is the seat of Ürgüp District. Its population is 24,647 (2022). The town lies at an average elevation of 1,044 m (3,425 ft).

As elsewhere in Cappadocia, the centre of Ürgüp is full of old stone houses clustered around a central rock formation, in this case Temenni Tepesi (Temenni Hill, Wish Hill).

Ürgüp got into the boutique-hotel movement early and as a result has a flourishing tourism industry, in part because it has more amenities than other Cappadocian destinations. It makes a good base for visiting all the main attractions of Cappadocia, including the rock-cut churches and the underground cities.

As well as tourism, Ürgüp has a thriving wine-growing industry. It also provided the setting for many episodes of the popular television series, Asmalı Konak which aired from 2002 to 2004 and was credited with kickstarting domestic tourism to Cappadocia.

Ürgüp features briefly in Philip Glazebrook's travelogue, A Journey to Kars, when he is forced to extend his stay there due to 1980 census-taking which decreed that no one could go anywhere and no transport was operating.

== History ==
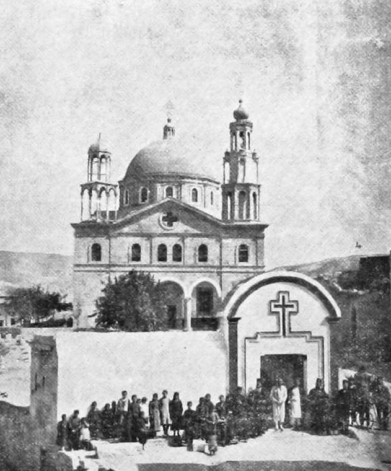
Ürgüp, Greek-orthodox Church St. John, Almanach Mikroasiatikon 1914.

The original occupation of the site of Prokopi/Ürgüp probably dates back to Hittite times although there is no longer anything to show for that today. A few tombs left from a necropolis serve as evidence of Roman occupation. Of Byzantine occupation there are also only scant traces, mainly of the Church of St Procopius, the saint after whom the town was originally named. Ürgüp was known as Osiana (Assiana) in the Byzantine period.

More evidence survives of the Selçuk presence here, especially in the form of the hexagonal Altı Kapılar (Six Gates) tomb of a military commander in the town centre. A symbolic tomb (1863) on top of Temenni Hill commemorates the Selçuk leader Ruknettin Kılıçarslan IV who was killed while in Ürgüp.

In late Ottoman times Prokopi/Ürgüp was home to a mixed population of Turks and Christians; according to the Ottoman General Census of 1881/82–1893, the kaza of Ürgüp had a total population of 23,030, consisting of 19,880 Muslims, 3,134 Greeks and 16 Armenians. It was during this period that most of the town centre's grand stone houses, many of them now converted into hotels, were built. Some of these houses still contain fine secular frescoes attesting to the fact that they were designed for members of the minority populations. The Sucuoğlu Konağı (Mansion) is visible to those prepared to poke around in the ruinous properties - one of its walls is decorated with scenes of a Zeppelin and a hot-air balloon flying over Constantinople/Istanbul.

It was also in the 19th century that a huge church was built to honour St John the Russian. It was demolished in the 1950s and a girls school built on the site; its memory lives on only in photographs. What is now the Şehir Hamamı (City Hamam) stands in the Greek neighbourhood which was known as the Gavur Mahallesi (Infidel Neighbourhood).

In 1924 the Greeks of Prokopi were forced to leave Turkey under the terms of the Treaty of Lausanne. When they left they took the relics of St John the Russian with them to their new home on the island of Euboea in Greece where murals on a church wall now depict the journey from Cappadocia. Other Greeks from Prokopi settled in Larissa in Greece.

== Local attractions ==
There is a small local museum inside the park in the centre of Ürgüp.

Uphill from the Hotel Surban, the Turasan Winery supplies 60% of Cappadocia's wines and offers free tours and tastings in its rock-carved wine cellar.

On the outskirts of Ürgüp, heading towards Göreme, a group of striking fairy chimneys to the right of the road are sometimes called 'The Three Beauties', 'Three Graces', 'The Family' or the 'Three Sisters'.

== Gallery ==
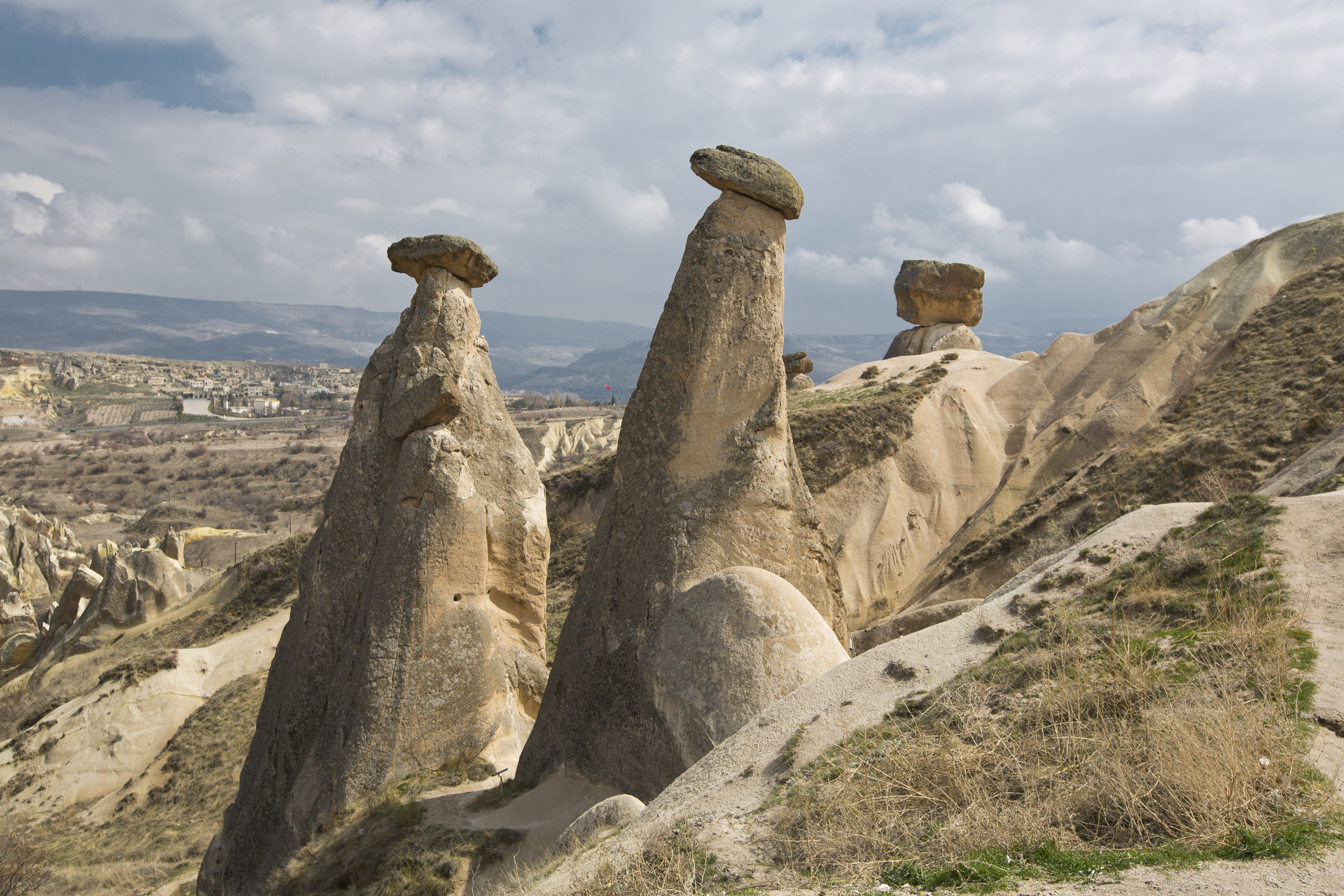
The 'Three beauties' fairy chimneys, thought to be named after to Hera, Athena and Aphrodite.

== Notable natives ==
- Saint John the Russian (1690-1730), Saint of the Eastern Orthodox Church
- Mustafa Güzelgöz (1921–2005), librarian known as the "Librarian with Donkey"

== International relations ==
Ürgüp is twinned with:

- Larissa, Greece (since 1996)
- Kireas, Greece (since 2004)

== See also ==
- Cappadocia
- Kayakapı
