= Mustafapaşa, Ürgüp =

Mustafapaşa
- Village
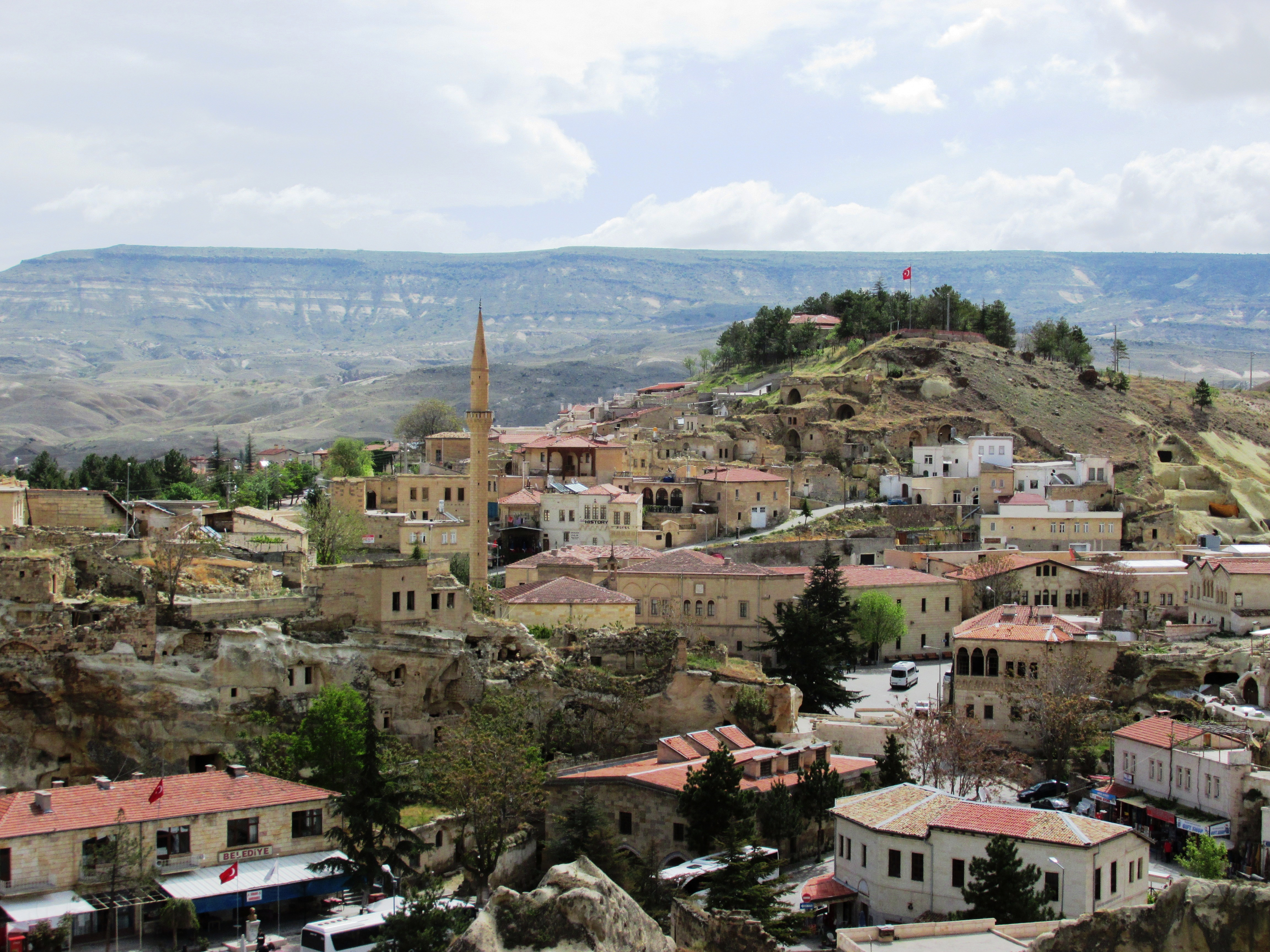

- Location within Turkey Location within Turkey Central Anatolia
- Coordinates: 38°35′11″N 34°53′52″E
- Country: Turkey
- Province: Nevşehir
- District: Ürgüp
- Elevation: 1,163 m (3,816 ft)
- Population (2022): 1,295
- Time zone: UTC+3 (TRT)
- Postal code: 50420
- Area code: 0384

Mustafapaşa, formerly known as Sinasos (Greek: Σινασός), is a town (belde) in the Ürgüp District of Nevşehir Province, Turkey. Its population is 1,295 (2022). Its status as a town had been downgraded to village with 2013 Reorganisation up until the court order in 2024. It lies to the west of Gomeda valley and is 5 kilometres (3.1 mi) away from Ürgüp and 27 kilometres (17 mi) away from Nevşehir town.

There are two main explanations of the origin of its name. One is being named after Mustafa Kemal Atatürk, the military leader and first president of Turkey. And other being named after a local hero called Mustafa Pasha, who got a well drilled to the village to solve its fresh water problem.

Like most of Cappadocia, Mustafapaşa used to depend for a living on agriculture., especially grape-growing. However, it lies within the region of Cappadocia, and increasingly depends on tourism for its living with new hotels opening all the time.

The town center is home to many buildings of Cappadocia University one of which is located in a 19th-century medrese.

== History ==
19th-century Mustafapaşa, a predominantly Cappadocian Greek settlement, was known by its Greek name Sinasos. Some of its inhabitants were Turkish-speaking Greeks. Since it was hard to make a living in Central Anatolia, many Sinasos Greeks migrated to Constantinople at this time and made a name for themselves as traders in seafood, especially caviar. Often they sent money back to their families in Sinasos and some of this was used to build the grand mansions that still survive in the town (and are rapidly being converted into hotels). In 1905, its population was composed of 3,000 Greeks and 1,000 Turks.

In 1924, however, according to the terms of the Treaty of Lausanne the entire Greek population of Sinasos was forced to leave for Greece in the Population exchange between Greece and Turkey. They mostly resettled in Nea Sinasos (New Sinasos), a town in the northern part of the island of Euboea in Greece. In their place came Macedonian Muslims from Kastoria, a town in Macedonia, Northern Greece. After the population exchange years the town lost much of its former prosperity although it is now well on the way to recovery.

== Attractions ==
Amongst the many stone houses in Mustafapaşa, one of the most notable is the Old Greek House, which now houses a popular restaurant. Its upstairs floor contains one of the secular murals which are a feature of both Ürgüp and Mustafapaşa, and which live on as a reminder of the lost minority populations. The first series of the hit television series Asmalı Konak was filmed in and around the Old Greek House in 2002.

In the town centre, the large 19th-century Church of St Helena and Constantine, with a grapevine carved around its entrance, is another reminder of the lost populations. It is occasionally used for concerts.

Cappadocia is known for its frescoed rock-cut churches and the Church of St Basil in Mustafapaşa is an example of one such church that continued in use into the 19th century when it was recut and repainted.

Several more traditional rock-cut churches can be found in the valley running out from Mustafapaşa which is easily accessible on foot. Most striking is the Monastery of St Nicholas which was restored in 2012 and contains modern icons brought from Greece. It also has a grand entrance which was built after the law prohibiting repairs to old churches was repealed in 1856. The Church of St Stephen contains a rock lectern supported by a stone eagle while the Sinasos Church has a stone pulpit, these features are almost certainly improvements paid for from the sale of seafood in Constantinople.

In the nearby Gomeda Valley there is also the early 10th-century frescoed Church of the Holy Apostles.
