= Ortahisar, Nevşehir =

Ortahisar
- Municipality
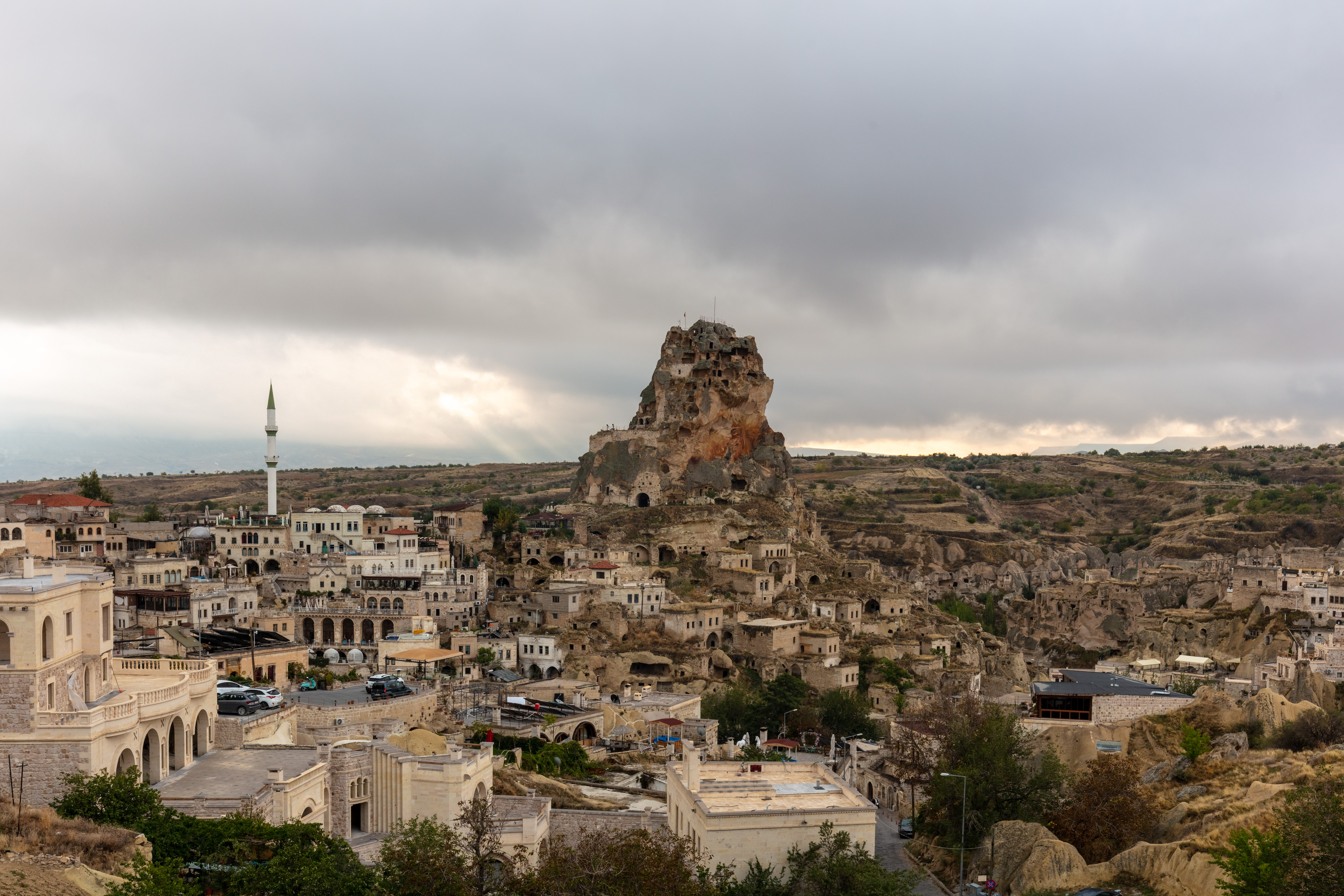
- View of Sivrikaya castle in centre of Ortahisar

- Location within Turkey Location within Turkey Central Anatolia
- Coordinates: 38°37′15″N 34°51′53″E
- Country: Turkey
- Province: Nevşehir
- District: Ürgüp

Government
  - Mayor: Mustafa Ateş (AKP)
- Elevation: 1,200 m (3,900 ft)
- Population (2022): 3,086
- Time zone: UTC+3 (TRT)
- Postal code: 50650
- Website: www.ortahisar.bel.tr

Ortahisar (Turkish: Middle Castle), previously known by its Byzantine name Potamía (Greek: Ποταμία), is a town (belde) in the Ürgüp District, Nevşehir Province, Turkey. Its population is 3,086 (2022). Ortahisar is located about 20 km east of the provincial capital, Nevşehir.

Until the mid-2010s Ortahisar was rather off-the-beaten-track when it came to Cappadocian tourism. It is now much better known and many boutique hotels have been created out of its fine old stone houses.

== Castle and churches ==
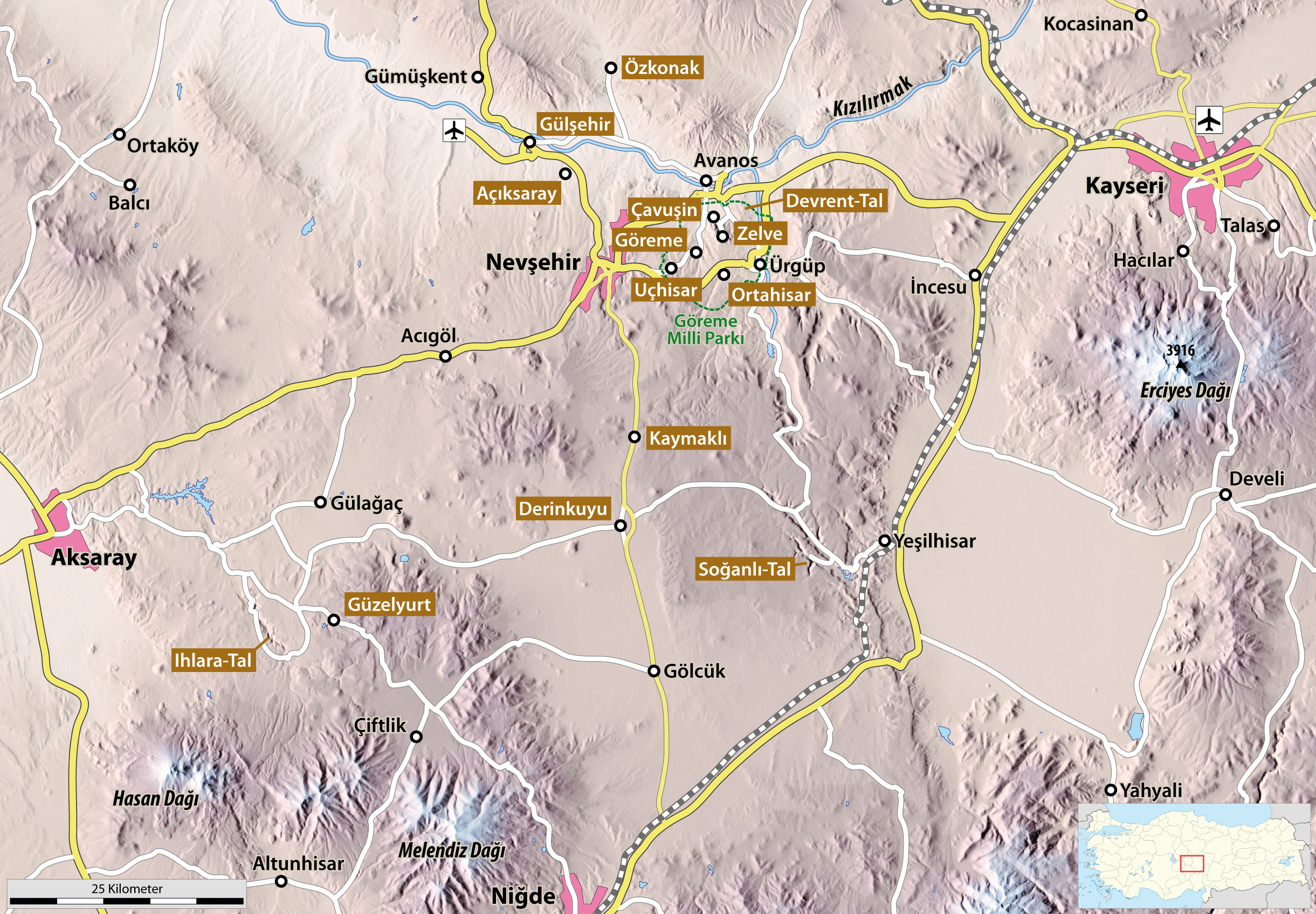
Ortahisar and other noteworthy places in Cappadocia

The small town is dominated by a 90-metre-high (300 ft) rock-castle in the centre of the town, which is called Sivrikaya by the inhabitants. It is an extraordinary example of the rock-cut architecture which is typical of the region and is believed to have served as a refuge from attackers in Byzantine times. The town also contains the Cambazlı Kilise ('Church of Acrobats'), a cross-in-square church with 13th-century wall paintings which is now used as a storehouse.

Aside from the rock-cut buildings in the centre of the town, Ortahisar is characterised by a series of old stone houses. The upper floors are made of blocks of tuff, mostly without mortar. These buildings which were only used for the storage of food in earlier times, are generally one or two stories high. The upper floor is often accessed by an exterior staircase made of tuff-stone slabs. The more recent buildings are all made from the same kind of stone, but are made of regular blocks. The exterior walls are covered with white limestone and capped with simple cornices.

Northeast of Ortahisar is a rock-cut monastery complex called Hallaç Manastırı which consists of a courtyard closed on three sides but open to the south. The gathering of rubble over time means that the ground level is one and a half metres higher than it was when the structure was built, so the entrances to the monastic rooms are lower than the courtyard. After the monastery was abandoned, the locals walled up the entrances and decorated the windows with coloured paint so that they could be reused as pigeonhouses for the production of guano as fertiliser.

A little outside the town is a fairy chimney which contains the Üzümlü Kilise ('Grapevine Church') dating from the 8th or 9th century AD. It contains frescoes with grapevines and an image of Mary enthroned with the baby Jesus in the apse. Also near Ortahisar is the Sarıca church.

== Economy ==
Ortahisar is a centre for fruit storage. The tuff-stone local caves, with a constant temperature of 10 °C in summer and winter, are used to store citrus fruits, potatoes, apples and onions, some of it transported north from Mersin. After fattening in the caves for up to nine months, the produce is transported onwards to other parts of Turkey, to Europe and to Russia.

== Bibliography ==
- Peter Daners, Volker Ohl, Kappadokien. Dumont, 1996, ISBN 3-7701-3256-4.
- Michael Bussmann/Gabriele Tröger, Türkei. Michael Müller Verlag 2004 ISBN 3-89953-125-6.
- Marianne Mehling (ed.), Knaurs Kulturführer in Farbe Türkei. Droemer-Knaur 1987 ISBN 3-426-26293-2.
