= Gülşehir Salt Mine =

Underground salt mine in Turkey

- Location within Turkey
- Location: Tuzköy, Gülşehir, Nevşehir, Turkey; 38.7749°N 34.4609°E
- Products: Salt
- Production: 150,000 tonnes
- Greatest depth: 85 m (279 ft)
- Company: Suat Bilgin

Gülşehir Salt Mine (Turkish: Gülşehir Tuz Madeni), officially named "Turkey 2023", is an underground salt mine located at Tuzköy village in Gülşehir district of Nevşehir Province, Central Anatolia Region, Turkey.

The salt mine is located in the "Hacı Bektaş Salt Basin" about 27 km (17 mi) far from Nevşehir. The estimated size of the reserve is 2.5 billion tonnes. It is reported that salt mining works have been carried out at site since the late Seljuk Empire era, around eight centuries ago. Currently, the salt mine is 700 m (2,300 ft) long situated at a depth of about 85 m (279 ft). More than 50 people are employed in the mine. Salt rock is mined by a tunnel boring machine and transported to the surface by trucks. The raw salt is processed in several refinement operations before it reaches a commercial quality. Annual production is 150,000 tonnes in average worth of ₺ 15 million (approx. US$ 2 million as of September 2020).

The salt rock reserves in the region stretch over an area of 530 ha (1,300 acres). The current operator Suat Bilgin told in an interview that he leased the salt mine in 2006 after a tender offer for a time period of 99 years.
