= Soğanlı Valley =

Valley in Kayseri Province, Turkey

Coordinates: 38°20′41″N 34°58′14″E

Soğanlı valley
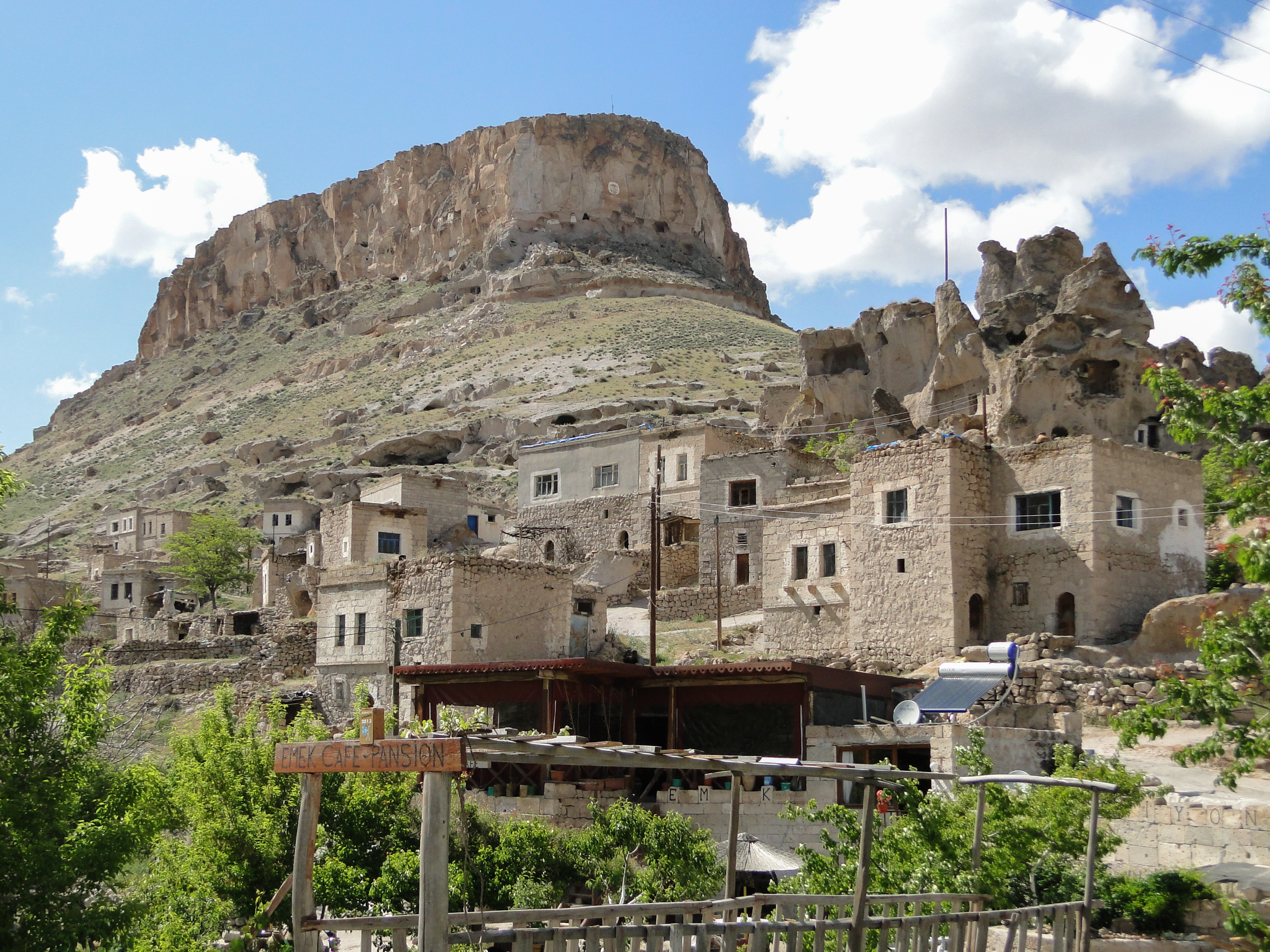
- Caves and dovecotes in the Soğanlı valley

- Location within Turkey

Geography
- Country: Turkey
- State: Kayseri Province
- Region: Cappadocia
- District: Yeşilhisar
- Interactive map of Soğanlı valley

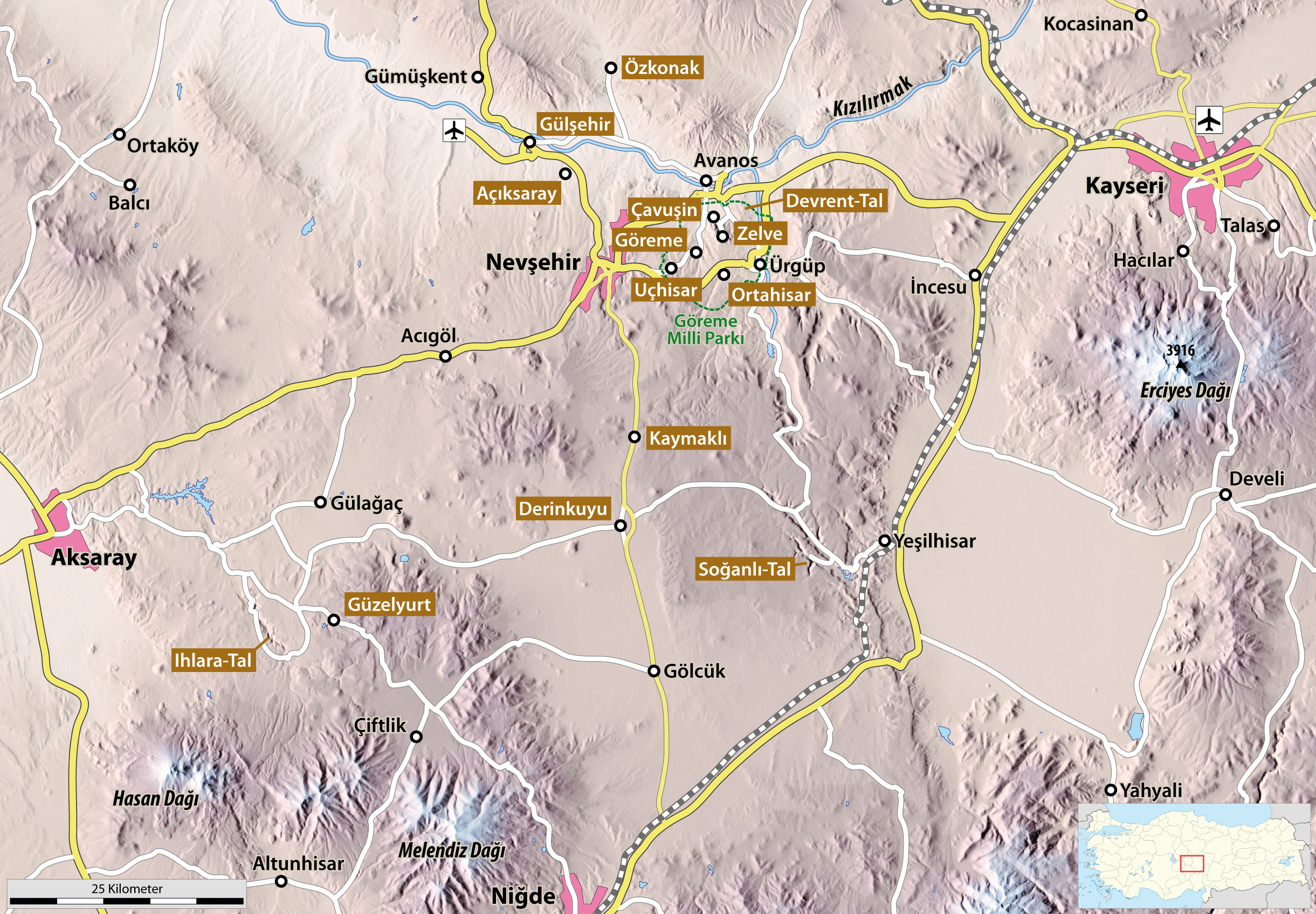
Soğanlı valley and other noteworthy places in Cappadocia

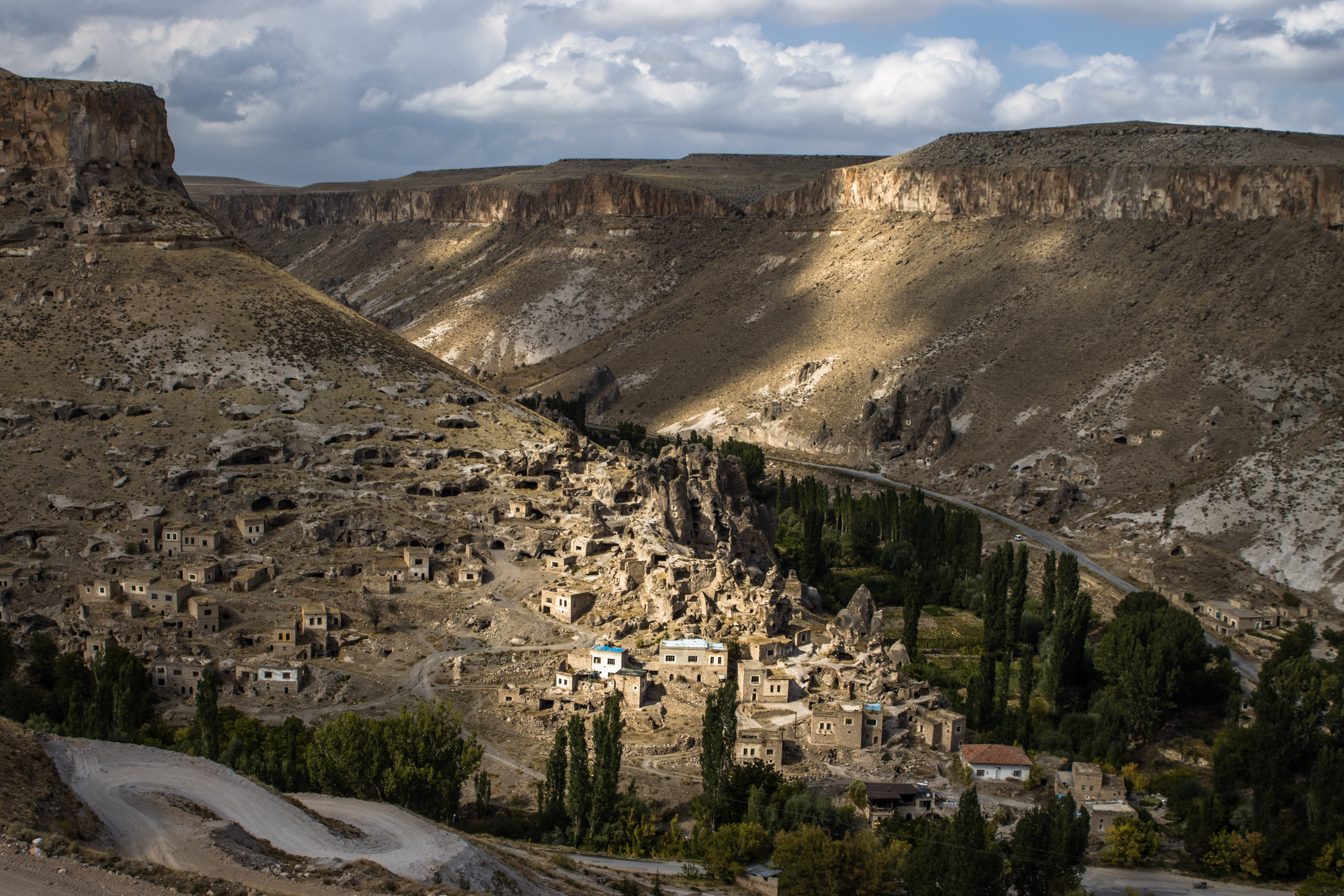
Soğanlı Rock formations Village in Cappadocia

Soğanlı Valley, formerly known as Soandós is located in the Yeşilhisar district, Kayseri Province, Turkey, in the southeastern part of the region of Cappadocia. The valley contains several rock-cut churches and other rock-cut buildings, carved from the soft tuff stone of the Cappadocian landscape.

The village of Aşağı Soğanlı ('Lower Soğanlı') is located at the southeastern end of the valley. The valley splits into northern and southern sections at the village of Yukarı Soğanlı ('Upper Soğanlı'). The valley was inhabited by Byzantine monks from the 9th to the 13th centuries AD. They are responsible for around a hundred churches that have been found in the valley and connected rock-cut houses and cloisters, most of which are now buried, ruined, or used as stables. There are also notable dovecotes carved into the cliffs, with entry holes marked out on the cliff using white paint.

== Churches ==
Before the start of the valley at Aşağı Soğanlı is the Tokalı Kilise ('Strap church'), which is not to be confused with the church of the same name in Göreme. It is high up in a cliff and is reached by a steep staircase with over 50 steps. There are graves in the wall in front of the church. Inside, the church has a nave with two aisles, but the frescoes have been completely destroyed.

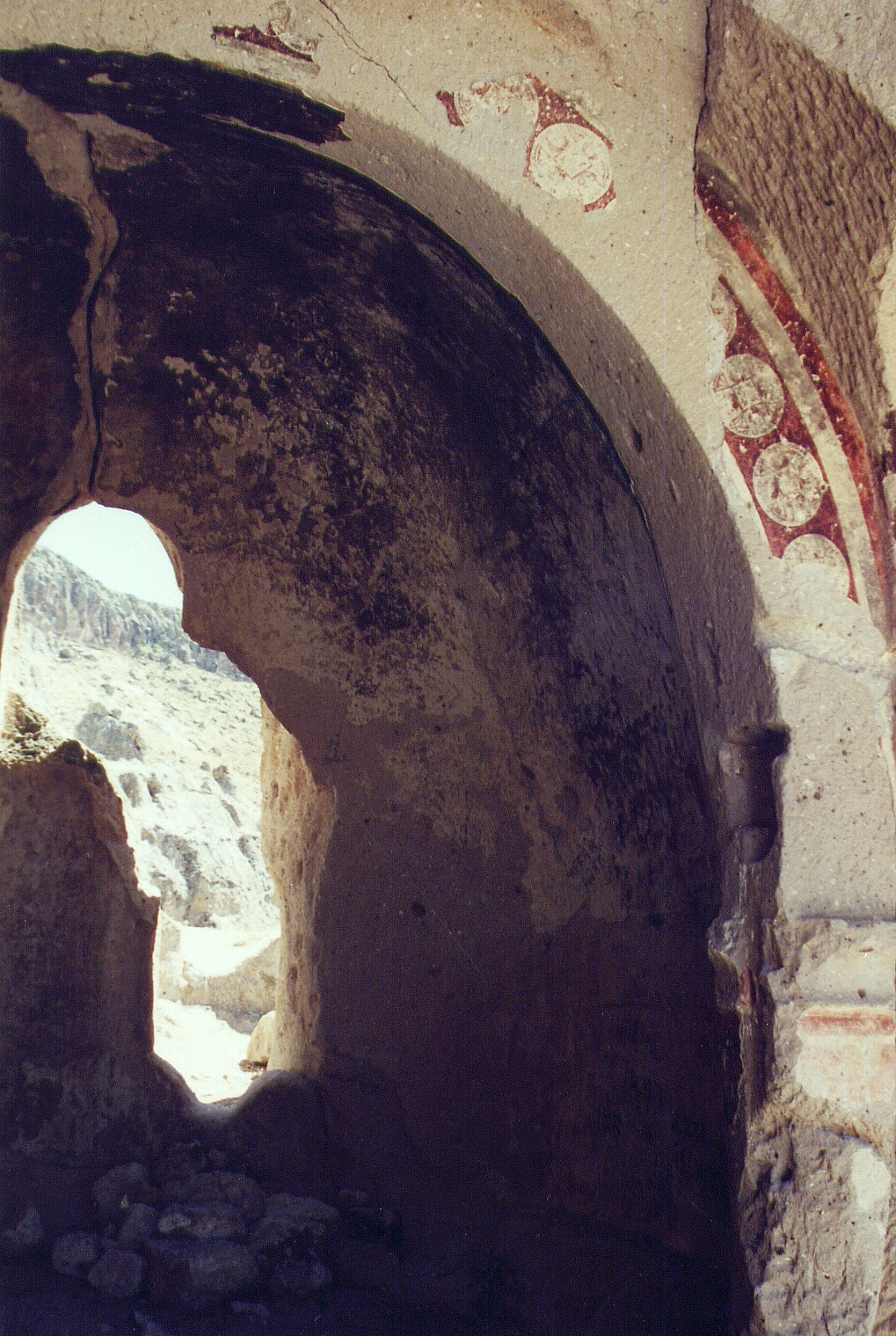
Remains of paintings in the Tokalı Kilise

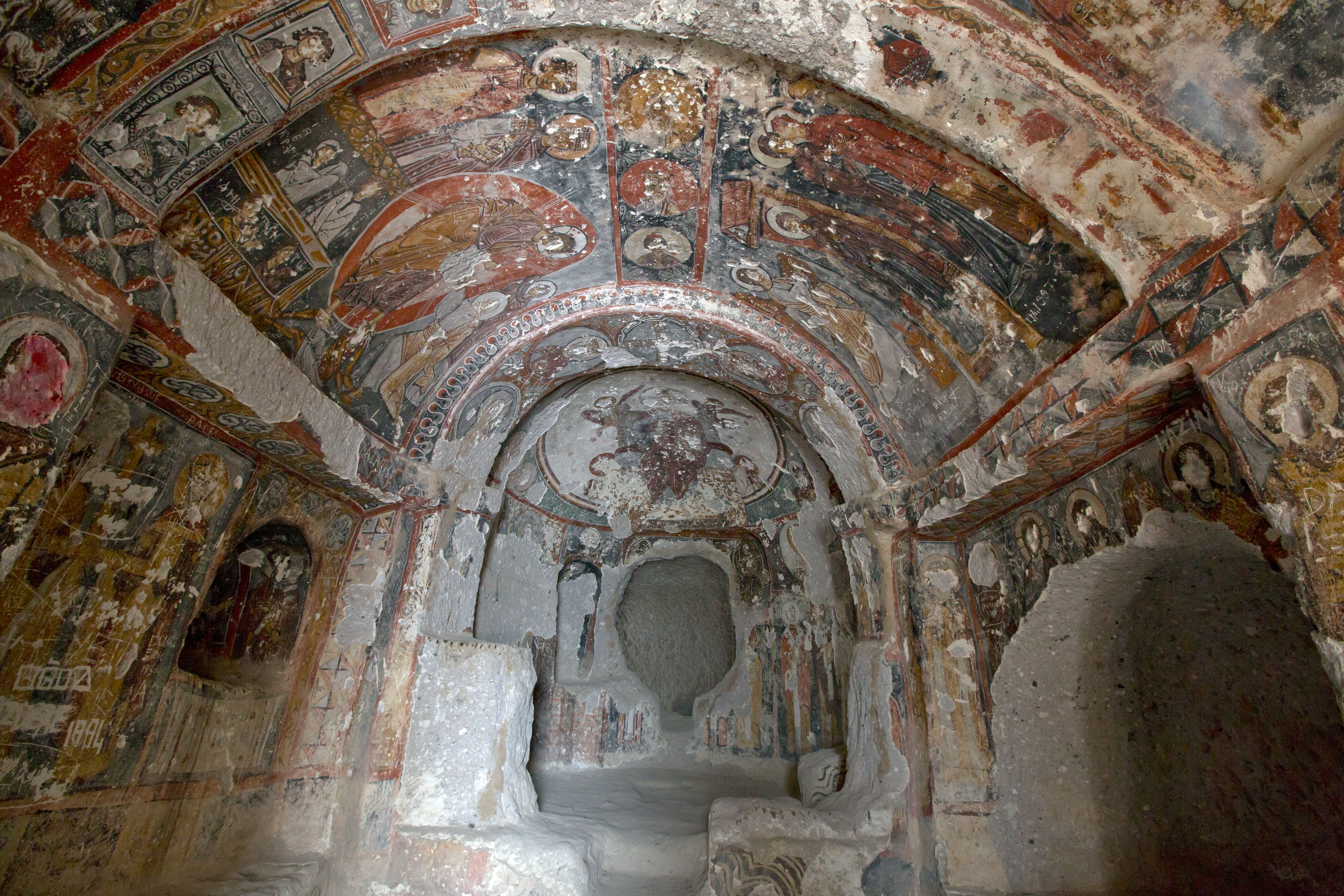
Tahtalı Kilise (St. Barbara Church).

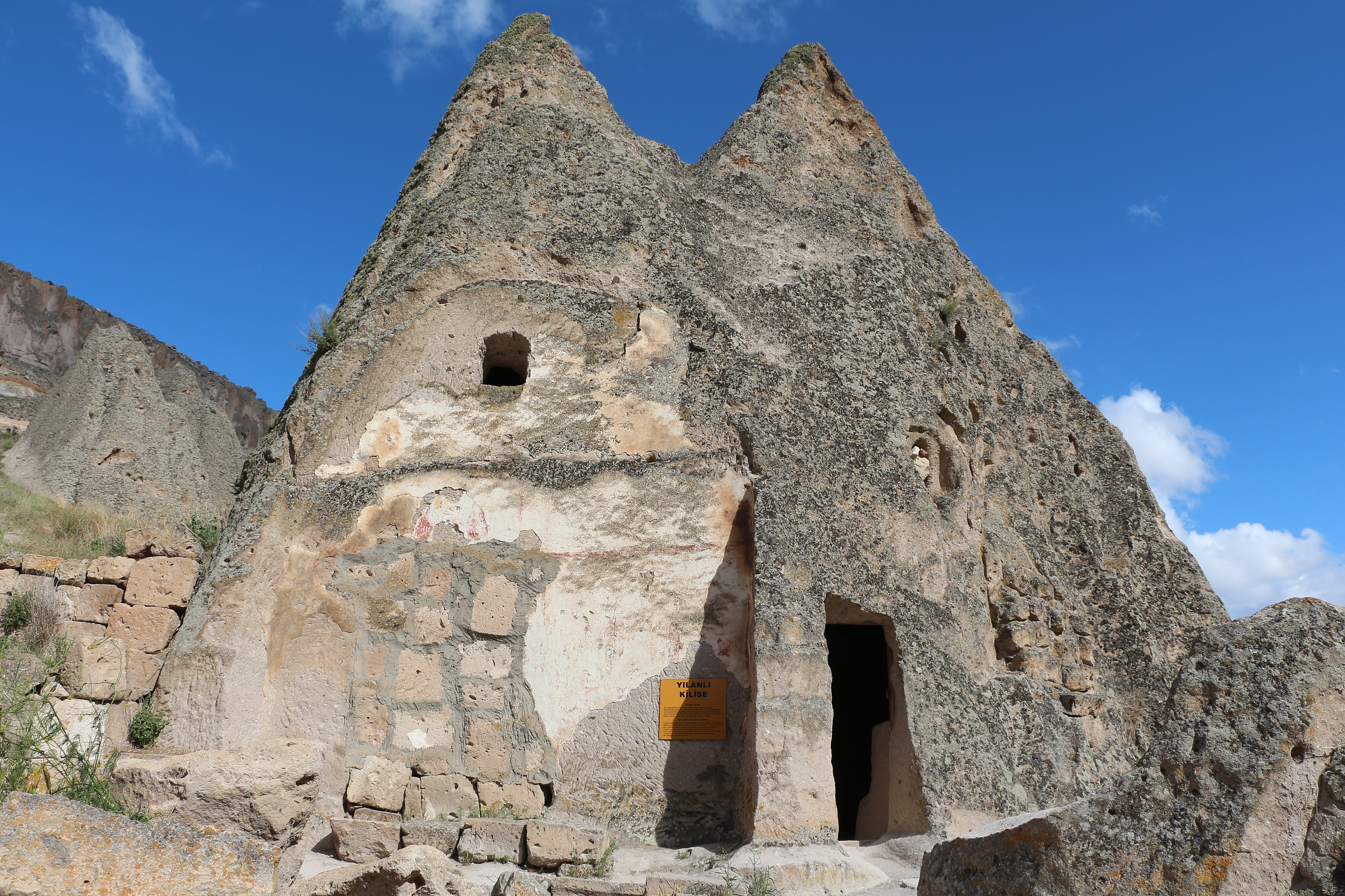
Outside entrance into the Yilanli Kilise, Soğanlı Valley.

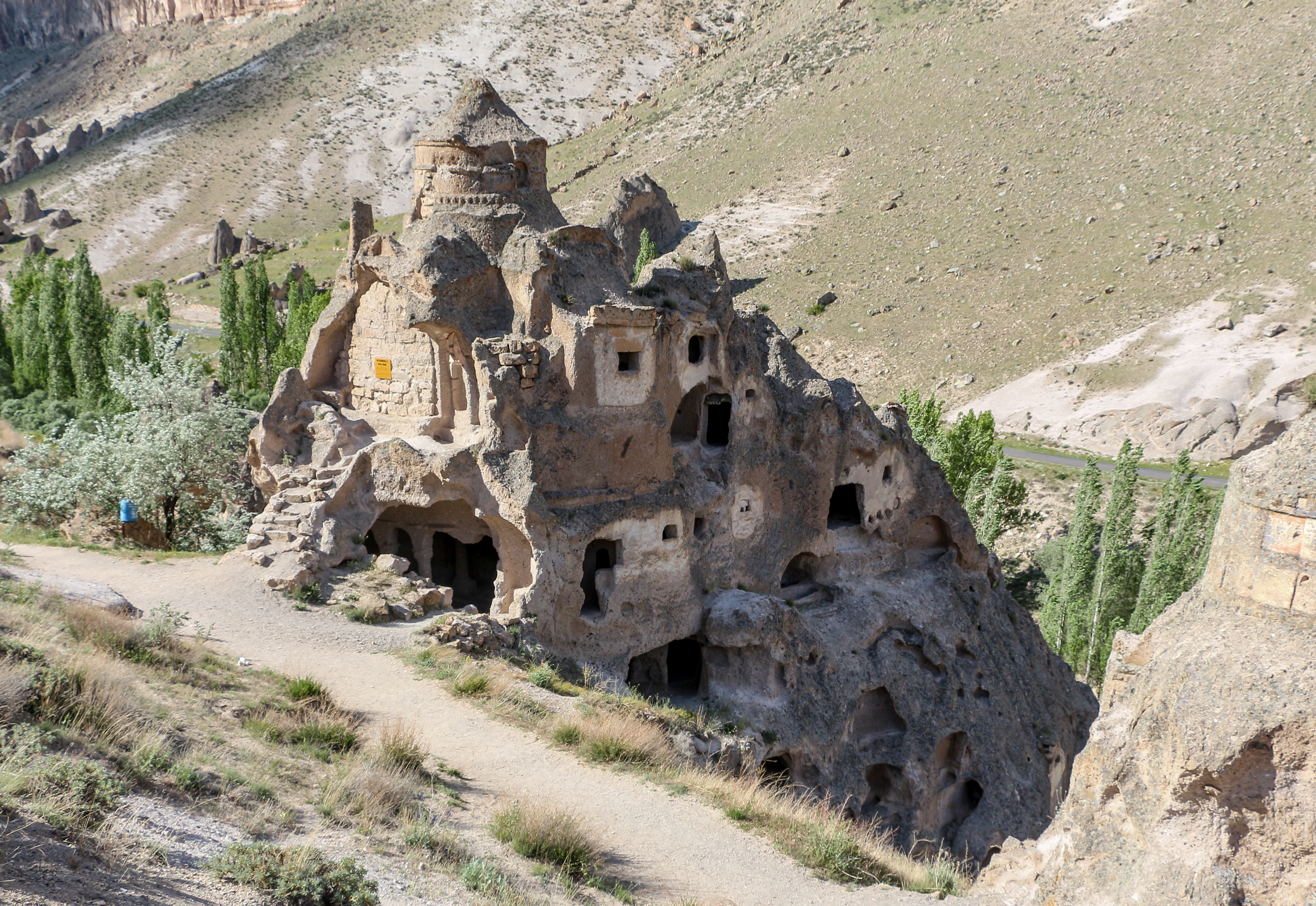
Kubbeli Kilise
- Karabaş Kilisesi ('Church with the Black Heads'), formerly known as ("St. Catherine Church"). in the northern branch of the valley has a nave with a barrel vault. According to an inscription of the Byzantine general Michael Skepides above the west door, the latest layer of frescoes were produced in the 13th century. They show scenes from the Life of Jesus, on a black background. The inscription above the church door mentions the date of foundation as 1060–1061. The donors are named as the Protospatharios Michael Skepides, the nun Katherine, and the monk Nyphonos. A collection of nearby buildings suggest that this church was the centre of a monastery.
- Also in the northern valley is Yılanlı Kilise ('Snake Church'), formerly known as the ("Virgin Mary Church"). A side-building of the barrel-vaulted church contains two arcosolium tombs cut out of the rock. The frescoes were covered over with black paint and are heavily damaged. Opposite this is the Kubbeli Kilisi (Cupola Church), a cupola church with side rooms from the 10th century, which is contained within a single fairy chimney. The chimney has been decorated on the outside with imitation masonry blocks and a dentil cornice, which were probably meant to convey the impression of a free-standing church.
- In the southern valley is the Church of Saint Barbara, also called Tahtalı Kilise ('Wood Church'). This barrel-vaulted church is arranged with a hall and a side chapel on a courtyard. According to a barely legible inscription, it dates to AD 1006 or 1021. The frescoes depict scenes from the New Testament, as well as the sole depiction of the Seven Sleepers in Cappadocia. The Turkish name derives from the wooden bridge which is now used to reach the church.
- Kubbeli Kilise, ('Domed church')
- Saklı Kilise, ('Hidden church')
- Tokalı Kilisesi ("Buckle church')
- Geyikli Kilise ('Deer church'), which gets its name from frescos found of St. Eustace (St. Eustathius).
- Soganli Han Complex
- Gok Kilise (Sky-blue Church)
- Eski Gumus (The Monastery of Gumusler)

== Economy ==
The inhabitants of the valley feed themselves from the produce of the local area. As fertiliser they use the guano collected by the large number of dovecotes carved into the cliffs. Since the valley is some distance from the centre of the Cappadocian region and there is no public transport link (dolmuş), it is little visited by tourists (Stand 1995).

== Gallery ==
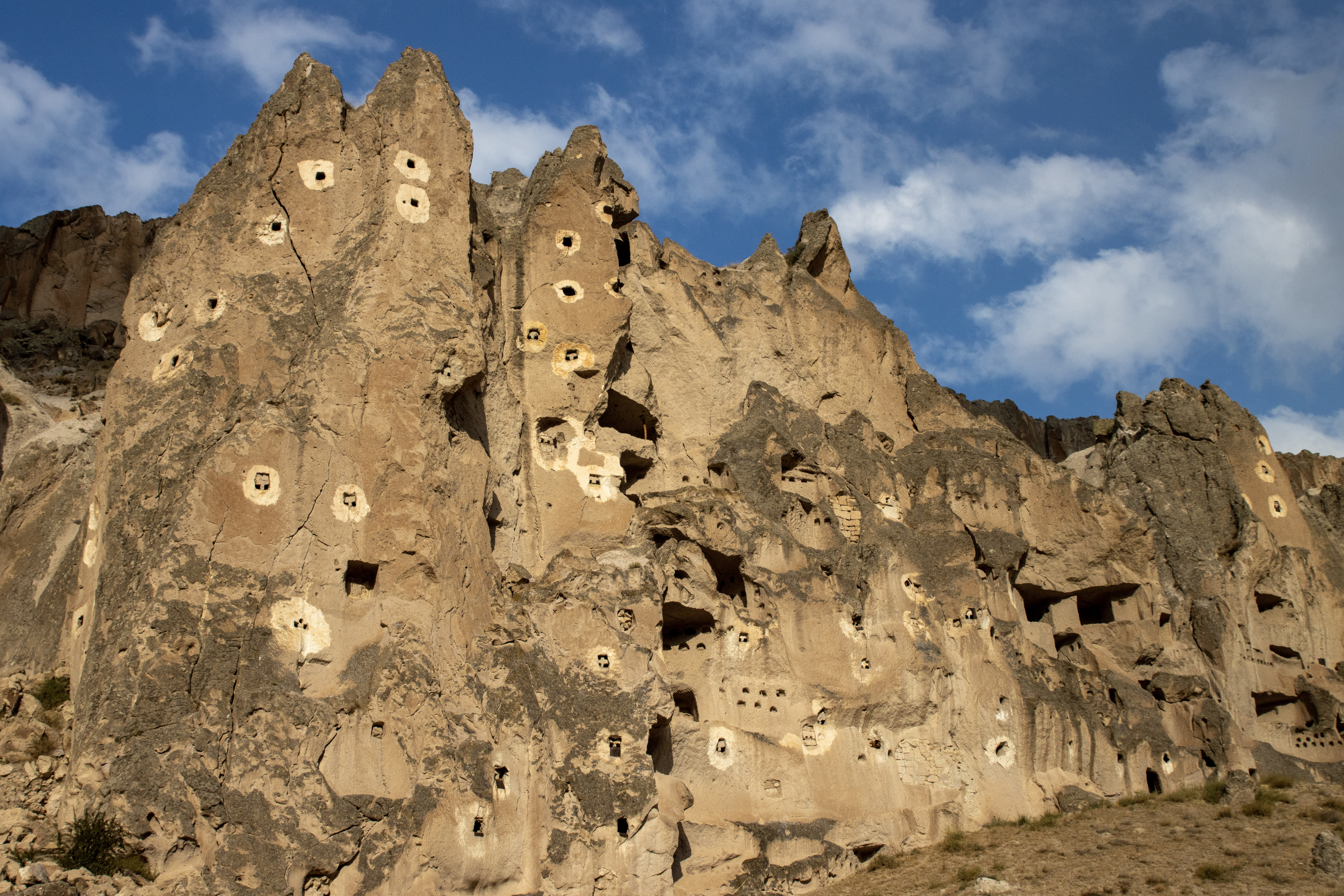
Soğanlı rock formations.

== See also ==
- Rock-cut architecture of Cappadocia

== Bibliography ==
- Peter Daners, Volher Ohl. Kappadokien. Dumont, 1996, ISBN 3-7701-3256-4
- Marianne Mehling (ed.). Knaurs Kulturführer in Farbe Türkei. Droemer-Knaur, 1987, ISBN 3-426-26293-2
- Michael Bussmann/Gabriele Tröger. Türkei. Michael Müller Verlag 2004 ISBN 3-89953-125-6
