= Saint John's Church, Gülşehir =

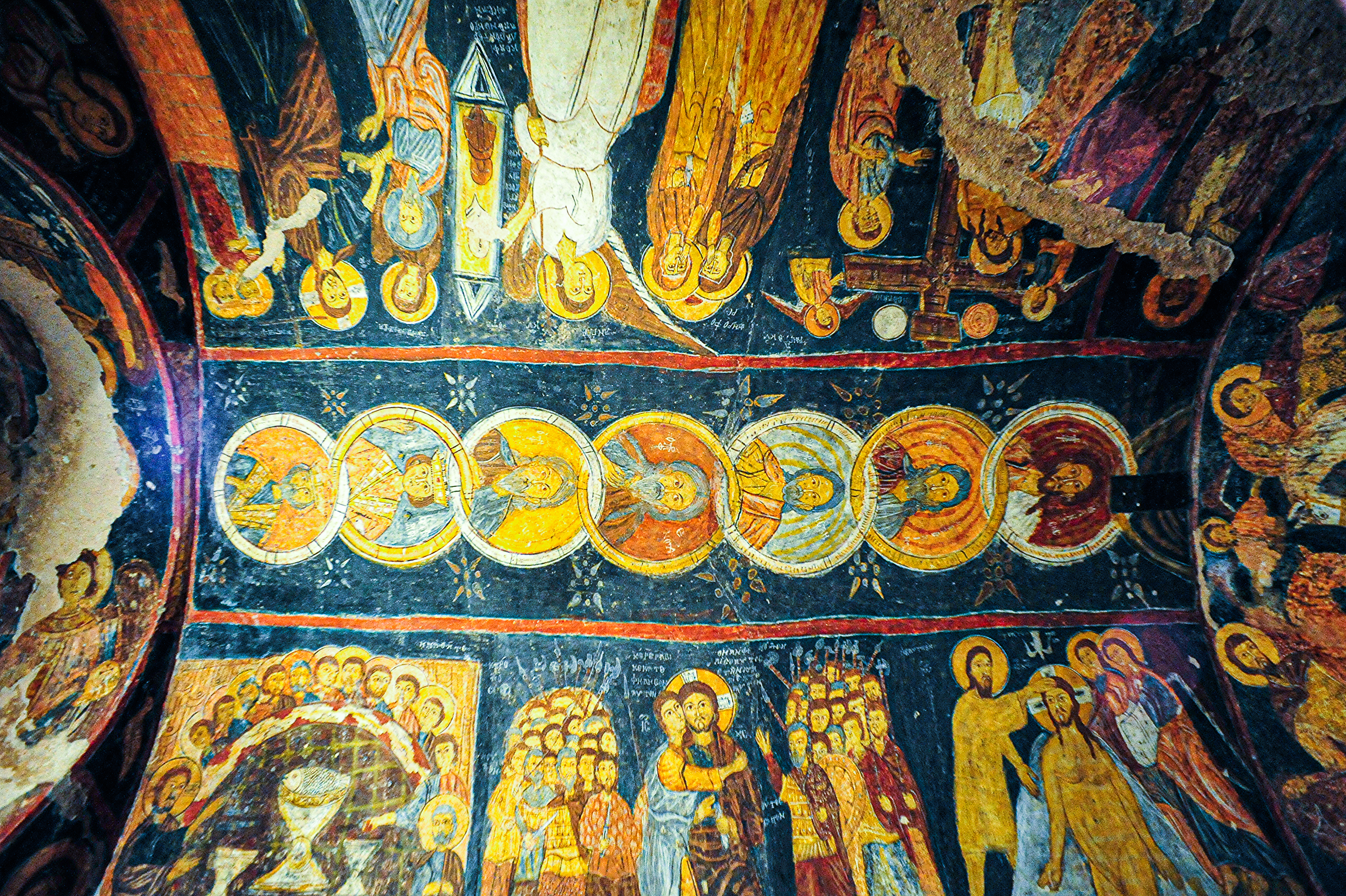
Frescoes in the church ceiling.

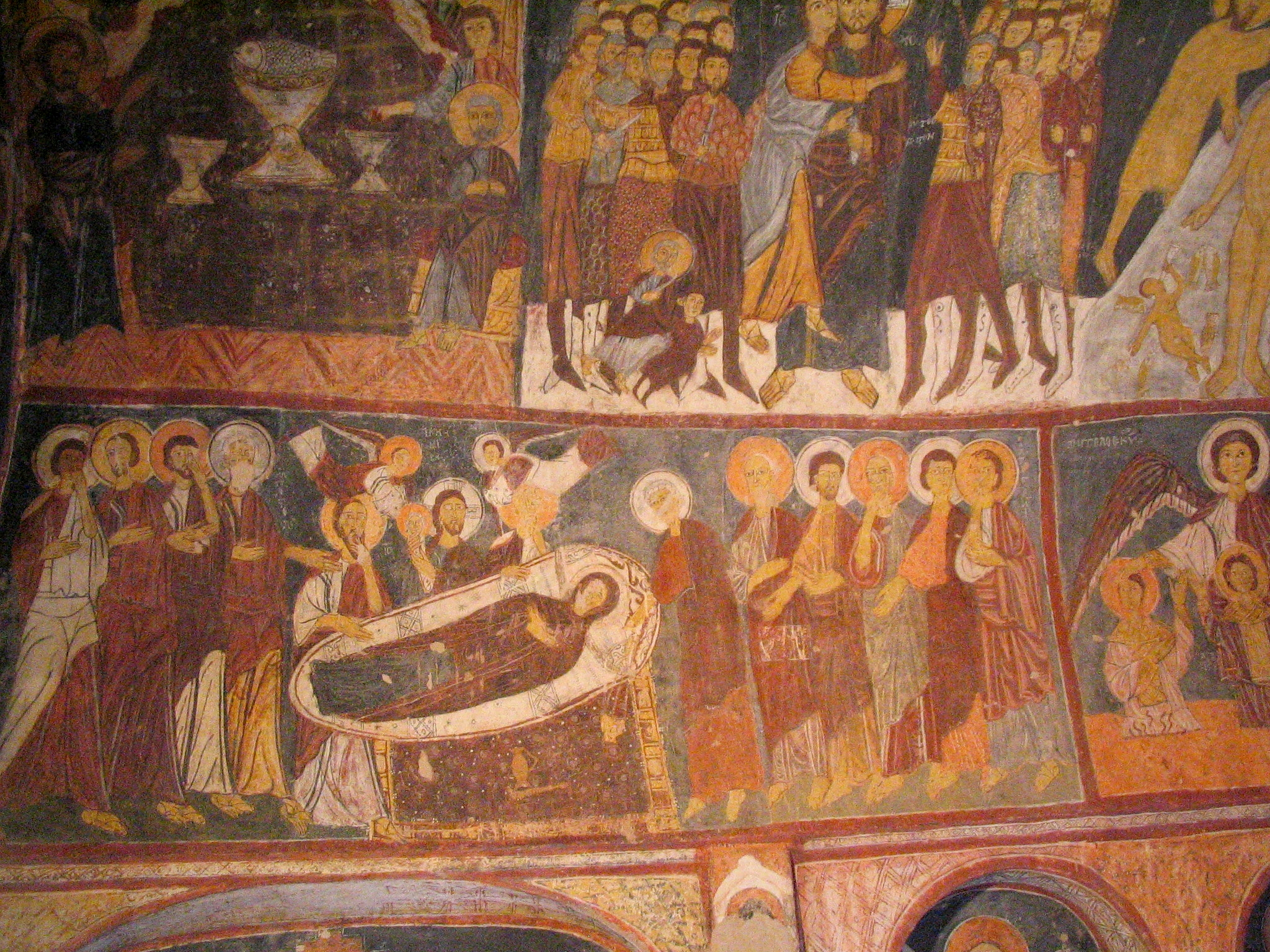
Frescoes in the church wall.

The Saint John's Church (Turkish: Karşı Kilise) is a historical rock-carved church in Cappadocia, Turkey.

== Location ==
The church is in Gülşehir ilçe (district) of Nevşehir Province at 38°44′27″N 34°38′03″E. Gülşehir is in the area historically known as Cappadocia, where historical rock-carved churches are common. Its distance from Nevşehir is 19 km (12 mi).

== History ==
The construction date of the original church is not known. However, it is considered to be earlier than Iconoclasm era of the Byzantine Empire because all human figures on the walls of the ground floor inside the church were erased. In 1212, the upper floor had been added to the original building. The upper floor has a rich collection of human figures. The original rock staircase was demolished. Presently, there is a modern staircase between the two floors. In 1995, the church was restored by Rıdvan İşler commissioned by the Ministry of Culture.

== Ground floor ==
There are rooms for the priests, a cellar and graves in the ground floor. A short tunnel leads to a dorm. The depictions on the wall are of non-human figures such as animals and geometric figures.

== Upper floor ==
Upper floor is full of frescoes. On the ceiling, there are figures of Abraham, Isaac, Jacob, Moses, Christ, Solomon and David. On the south wall, Baptism of Christ, Last Supper, Kiss of Judas were depicted. The frescoes on the north wall are depictions of Virgin Mary, Mary Magdalene and another woman by Christ's body. On the other walls, scenes from the Bible and history such as Saint George and Saint Theodore, Satan, Emperor Constantine and his mother were depicted.
