= Gülşehir =

- Municipality
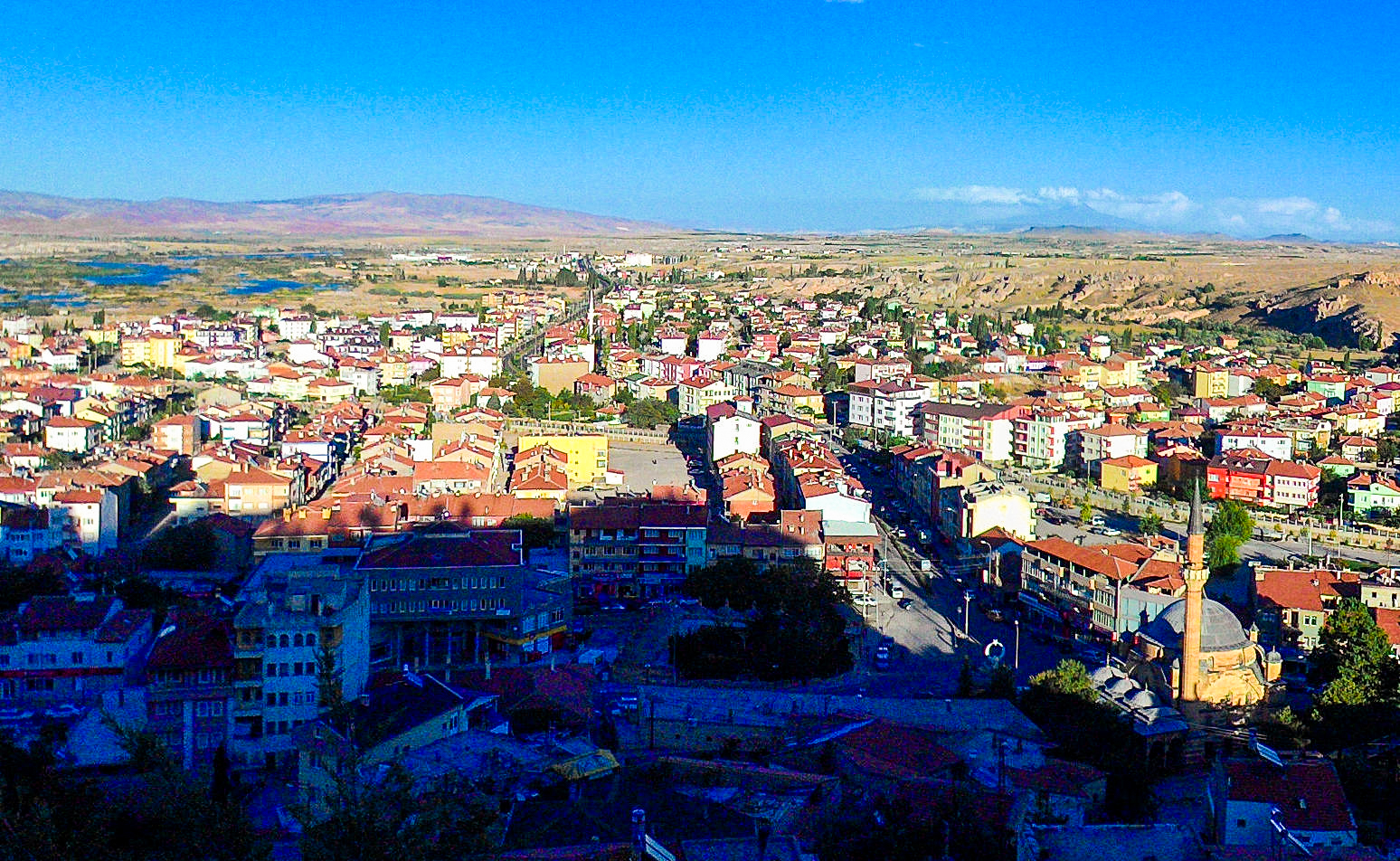

- Location within Turkey Location within Turkey Central Anatolia
- Coordinates: 38°44′47″N 34°37′14″E
- Country: Turkey
- Province: Nevşehir
- District: Gülşehir

Government
  - Mayor: Erkan Çiftci (MHP)
- Elevation: 885 m (2,904 ft)
- Population (2022): 12,474
- Time zone: UTC+3 (TRT)
- Postal code: 50900
- Area code: 0384
- Climate: Csb
- Website: www.gulsehir.bel.tr

Gülşehir, formerly and Arapsun, ancient Zoropassos (Ancient Greek: Ζωρόπασος), is a town in Nevşehir Province in the Central Anatolia region of Turkey, in the vicinity of the Fairy Chimney valley of Göreme. It is the seat of Gülşehir District. Its population is 12,474 (2022). The average elevation of the town is 885 m (2,904 ft) above sea level.

== History ==
The old name of Gülşehir, situated on the southern bank of the Kızıl River, 20 km from Nevşehir, is Arapsun and in ancient times it was called "Zoropassos" by the Hittites. In the vicinity of Gülşehir there are still rocks and steles with inscriptions from the Hittites. The earlier names of Gülşehir, Arapsun and Yarapson, probably preserve the ancient Tripotamos. It has also been referred to as Arabissus, but this is likely the ancient name of later Yarpuz and modern Afşin, some 200 km to the east.

The Ottoman Grand Vizier Karavezir Mehmet Seyyid Pasha did the same thing in Gülşehir as Damat İbrahim Pasha did in the nearby Nevşehir and a külliye was built in the town which had only 30 houses. The complex consisted of a mosque, a madrasah and a fountain.

According to the Ottoman General Census of 1881/82-1893, the kaza of Gülşehir had a total population of 14,984, consisting of 11,029 Muslims, 3,935 Greeks and 20 Armenians.

It was district centre in Aksaray Province between 1920 and 1933 and then in Niğde Province between 1933 and 1954. It got its present name in 1948.

The pottery, located completely inside an artificial cave deep in the rock, is a local tourist attraction.

== See also ==
- Cappadocia
- Cappadocian Greeks
- Saint John's Church, Gülşehir
- St. Theodore Church also known as Üzümlü Kilise in Derinkuyu
- St. Demetrius Church
- Gülşehir Salt Mine
- Gülşehir Barajı (Dam)
- Yalıntaş Pond (Göleti)
